= History of plug-in hybrids =

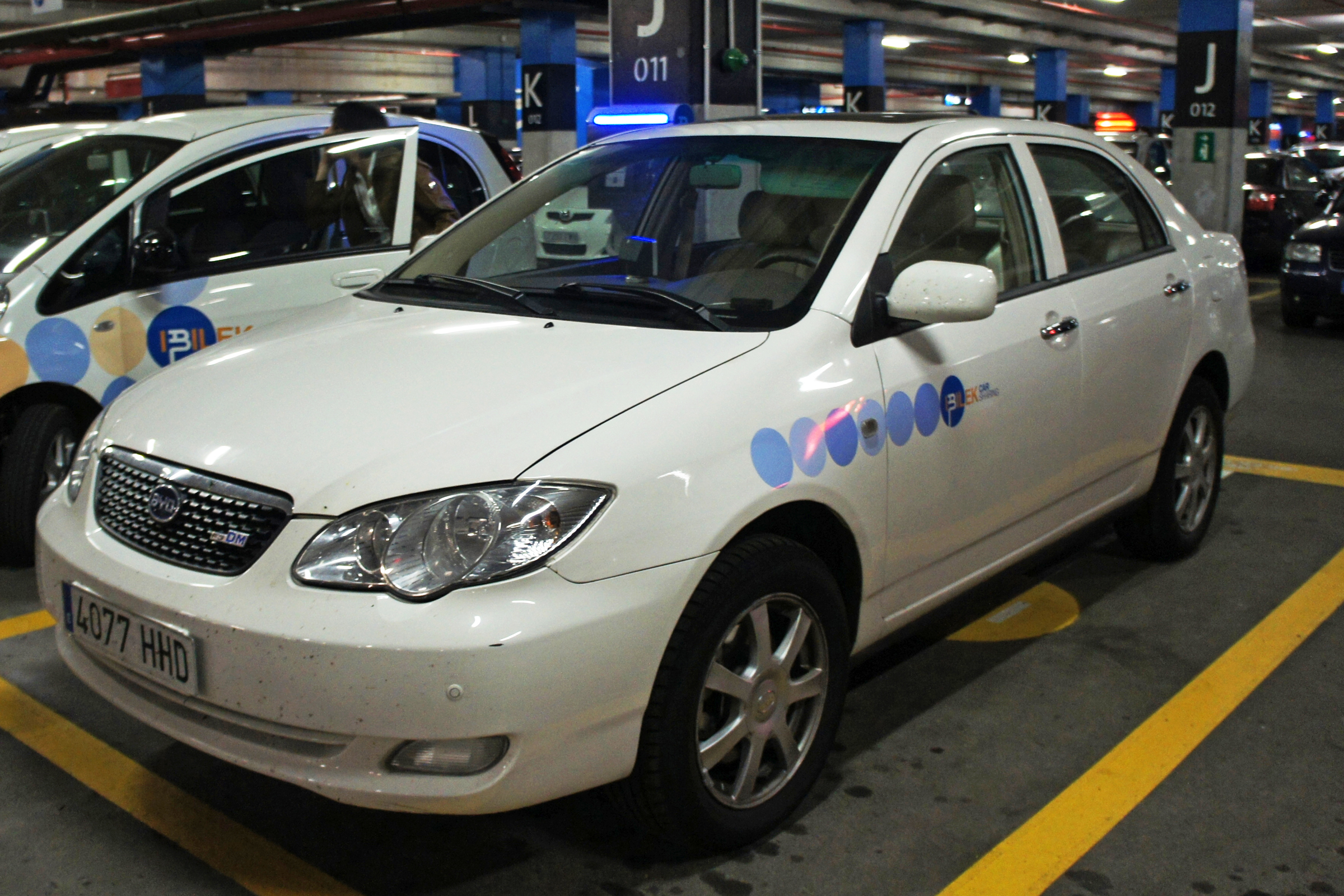
The BYD F3DM was the world's first mass produced plug-in hybrid passenger car, launched in China for fleet sales in December 2008.

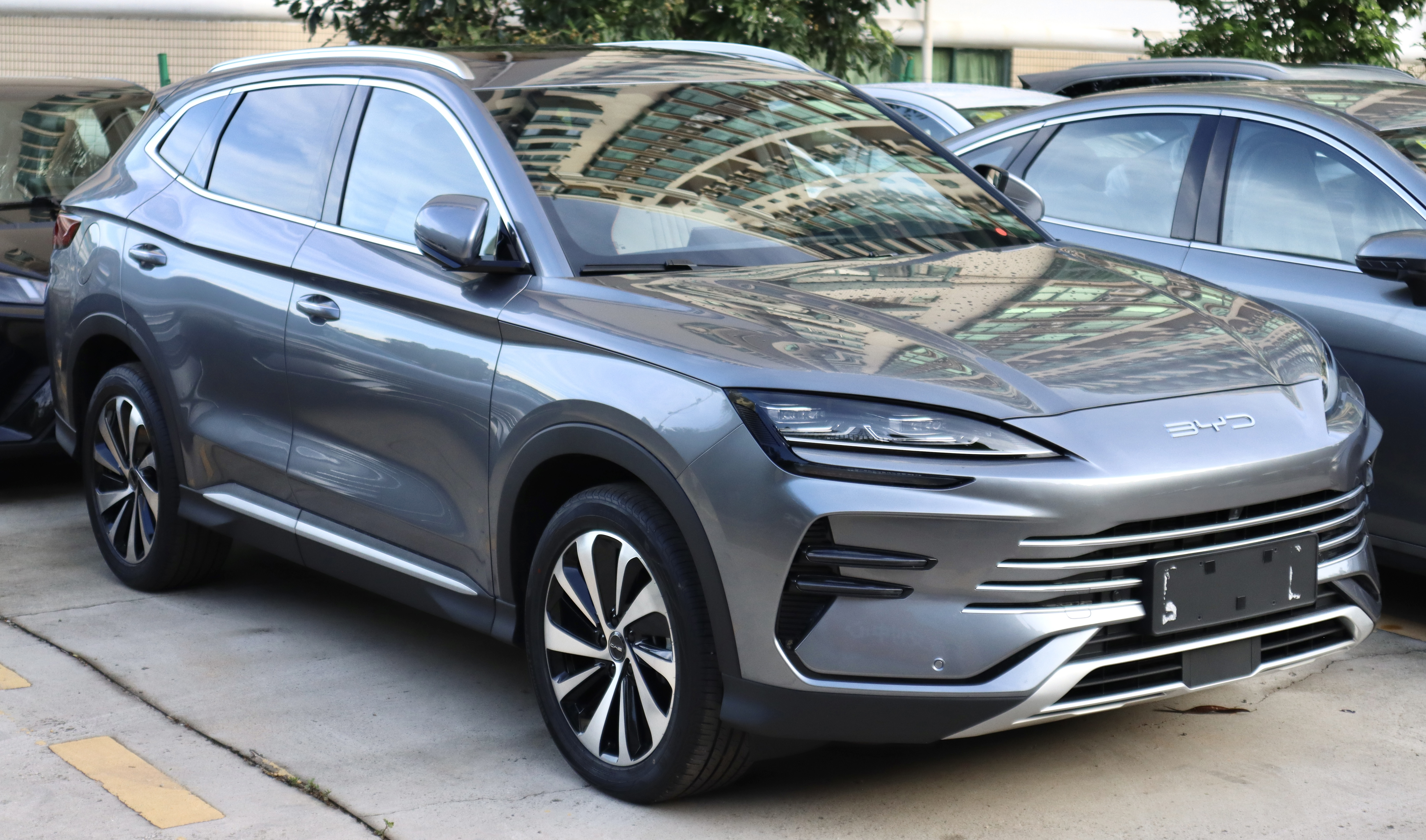
The BYD Song Plus was the world's best selling PHEV in the first half of 2025.

The history of plug-in hybrid electric vehicles (PHEVs) spans a little more than a century, but most of the significant commercial developments have taken place after 2002. The revival of interest in this automotive technology together with all-electric cars is due to advances in battery and power management technologies, and concerns about increasingly volatile oil prices and supply disruption, and also the need to reduce greenhouse gas emissions. Between 2003 and 2010, most PHEVs were conversions of production hybrid electric vehicles, and the most prominent PHEVs were aftermarket conversions of 2004 or later Toyota Prius, which have had plug-in charging and more lead–acid batteries added and their electric-only range extended.

Global sales of plug-in hybrids grew from over 300 units in 2010 to 222,000 in 2015 and 7.2 million in 2025. As of December 2025, China is the world's largest plug-in hybrid car market with a stock of 15 million units, followed by the United States with 1.9 million vehicles, Germany with 1.1 million, the UK with 860,000 and France with 810,000. As of December 2025, there are about 25 million plug-in hybrid electric cars in the world, about one third of the total stock of 75 million plug-in electric cars. In the half year to June 2025, the BYD Song Plus was the world's top selling plug-in hybrid car, with 188,500 units sold (5.4% of all PHEV sales) over the period. BYD models accounted for seven of the top ten best-selling PHEVs over this period, with the Li Auto L6 (96,400), Galaxy Starship 7 (70,900) and Aito M9 (58,700) also among the top ten.

== 1899–1999 ==
Hybrid vehicles were produced beginning as early as 1899 by Lohner–Porsche. Early hybrids could be charged from an external source before operation. However, the term "plug-in hybrid" has come to mean a hybrid vehicle that can be charged from a standard electrical wall socket.

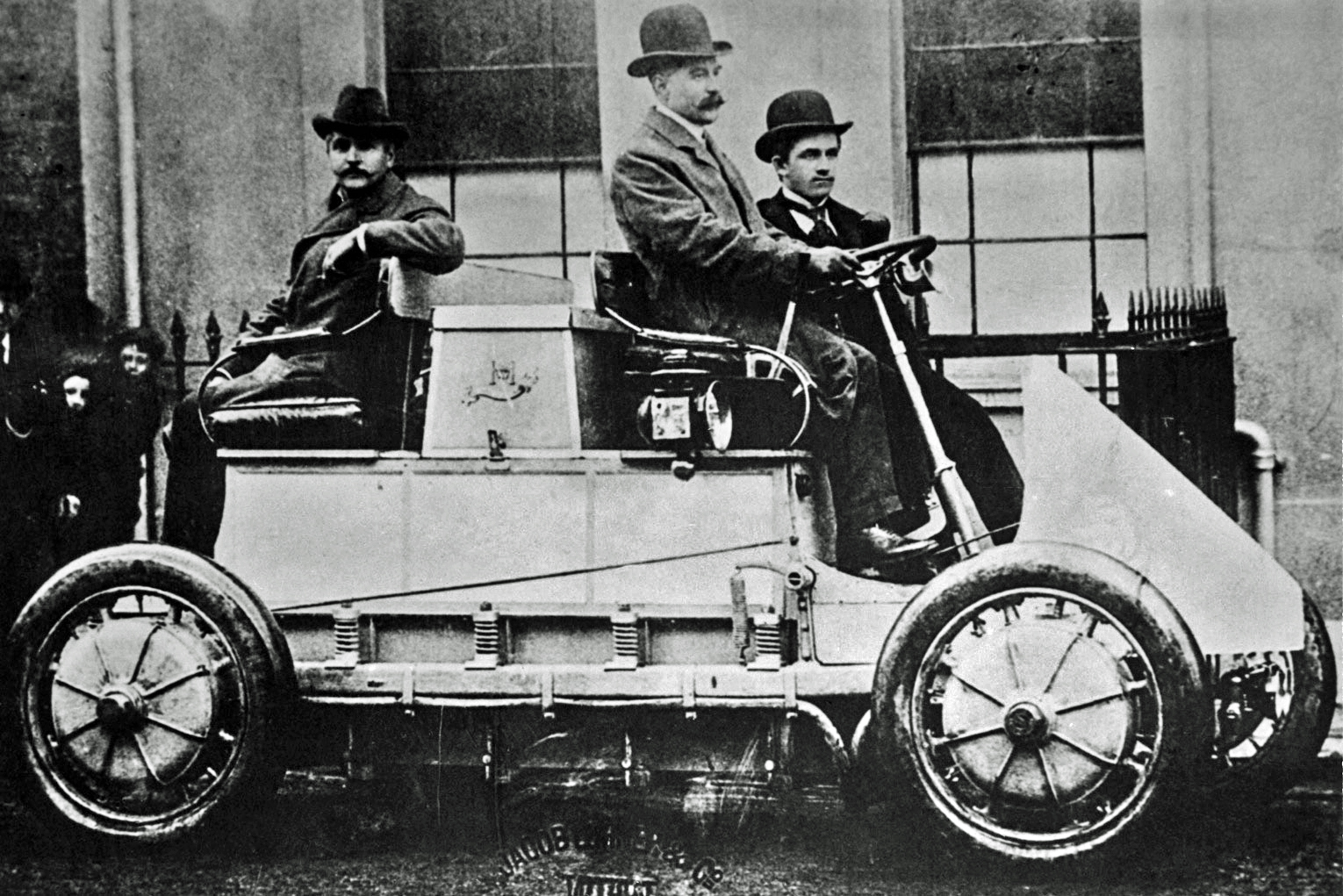
The Lohner–Porsche Mixte Hybrid was the first gasoline-electric hybrid automobile.

The July 1969 issue of Popular Science magazine featured an article on the General Motors XP-883 plug-in hybrid. The concept commuter vehicle housed six 12-volt lead–acid batteries in the trunk area and a transverse-mounted DC electric motor turning a front-wheel drive trans-axle. The gasoline-powered engine was connected to the trans-axle via a worm gear. The car could be plugged into a standard 110 Volt AC outlet for recharging.

In 1971, Dr. Andy Frank, the inventor of the modern PHEV, begins working on hybrids and PHEVs. He is professor of Mechanical and Aeronautical Engineering at the University of California at Davis.

The September 1975 issue of Popular Mechanics magazine featured a cover story on an experimental "turbo-electric" hybrid that "plugs in overnight for thrifty driving around town." Built by electronics engineer Harry Grepke, the vehicle used eight 12-volt truck batteries and a turbine genset. Grepke claimed an all-electric range of 50 miles (80 km).

In 1989, Audi produced its first iteration of the Audi Duo, a plug-in parallel hybrid based on the Audi 100 Avant Quattro. This car had a 12.6 bhp (9.4 kW) Siemens electric motor which drove the rear wheels. A trunk-mounted nickel-cadmium battery supplied energy to the motor that drove the rear wheels. The vehicle's front wheels were powered by a 2.3-litre five-cylinder engine with an output of 136 bhp (101 kW). The intent was to produce a vehicle which could operate on the engine in the country and electric mode in the city. Mode of operation could be selected by the driver. Just ten vehicles are believed to have been made; one drawback was that due to the extra weight of the electric drive, the vehicles were less efficient when running on their engines alone than standard Audi 100s with the same engine.

Beginning around 1990, Professor Andy Frank of the University of California, Davis began using student teams to build operational prototype Plug-in hybrid electric vehicles. His work attracted industry support and funding from Nissan, Koyo Seiko, General Motors, Saturn, Ford, Visteon, JATCO, Ovonics, the Defense Advanced Research Project Agency (DARPA), Sacramento Municipal Utility District, Southern California Edison, the United States Department of Energy, and others. The UC Davis PHEVs won several DOE/USCAR "Future Car" and "Future Truck" national competitions.

Inspired by his work as an EV1 propulsion system engineer, Jeff Ronning began developing concepts for plug-in hybrids in the mid-1990s at then Delco Remy, Division of GM. EV1 prototypes were sometimes attached with "range-extender" trailers, developed by Alan Cocconi of AC Propulsion. These trailers were simply rolling gen sets that could supply power for long trips. It was only natural to conceive of an EV1 with a small turbo-alternator on board (1995 internal publication). External publications (SAE 971629 and 1999-01-2946) followed expounding the merits of using electrical energy for most local travel and proving it with the data from the US DOT. "Unlimited EV" and "Battery Dominant Hybrid" as well as "Energy Hybrid" were the given names for the architecture because the term "plug-in" hybrid coined by Dr. Andy Frank was considered at odds with Toyota's position that Prius did not need to be "plugged in" and their opinion that plugging was inconvenient. In 1997 (ten years before Volt), an internal project at the new spin-off, Delphi Corporation, began to convert an EV1 to a PHEV. However, the project was canceled by the corporate directors of technology.

In 1994, the Esoro H301 two-door, four passenger plug-in hybrid sedan was built in Switzerland by the vehicle prototyping company Esoro AG. Four such prototypes are still on the road. The lightweight (710 kg/1565 lb) vehicle featured a 360 cc engine in parallel with a 34 kW air-cooled AC induction motor. The 9 kWh nickel-cadmium battery could be recharged in four hours from a 220 V electrical wall outlet, or from 30% to 80% state of charge in about two hours at a steady speed of 120 km/h.

In 1998, Audi premiered a second iteration of the Duo plug-in hybrid, based on the Audi A4, at the Frankfurt Motor Show. The 1998 Audi Duo featured a parallel configuration similar to its predecessor. At the time, hybrid propulsion was considered as a promising solution to Europe's inner city emissions problems. Audi AG leased ten Duo PHEVs to Solarmobilverein Erlangen in the city of Erlangen, Bavaria as part of ELCIDIS (Electric Vehicle City Distribution), an advanced mobility project funded by the European Commission. Solar recharging stations were envisioned, but were not built. The fleet trial ended in August 2001.

About sixty 1998–1999 Audi Duo PHEVs were built. However, few customers were prepared to pay twice the price as the base model A4 equipped with an identical diesel engine, and series production was stopped.

== 2000–2005 ==
2000

The Electric Power Research Institute (EPRI) sponsored the Hybrid Electric Vehicle Alliance to promote and develop original equipment manufacturer commercialization of plug-in hybrid electric vehicles. Alliance members include major automakers, national labs, utilities, and the University of California at Davis. EPRI's Hybrid Electric Vehicle Working Group published reports on PHEV attractiveness. Dr. Frank received new support from the European Commission, South Coast Air Quality Management District, Yolo-Solano Air Quality Management District, California Air Resources Board, and other governmental agencies.

2001

The U.S. Department of Energy created the National Center of Hybrid Excellence at UC Davis, with Dr. Frank as Director. Dr. Frank also obtained substantial GM funds to hybridize and plug-in GM's EV1. EPRI's Hybrid Electric Vehicle Working Group (HEVWG) published a report on costs and efficiencies of hybrid and plug-in hybrid vehicles. The report evaluated a small car, a midsize car, and an SUV, and simulated four powertrains for each vehicle: a conventional powertrain, a parallel HEV, a PHEV-20, and a PHEV-60.

Terminology note: A plug-in hybrid's all-electric range is designated by PHEV-(miles) or PHEV(kilometers)km representing the distance the vehicle can travel on battery power alone. For example, a PHEV-20 can travel 20 miles without using its internal combustion engine, or about 32 kilometers, so it may also be designated as PHEV32km.

2002

Entrepreneurs, environmentalists and engineers created the California Cars Initiative. CalCars is a non-profit PHEV advocacy and technology development group.

2003

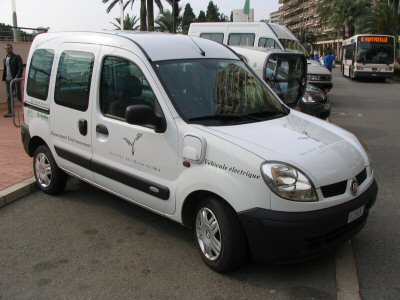
The redesigned Renault Kangoo Elect'road operates in blended mode.

Renault began selling the Elect'Road, a plug-in series hybrid version of their popular Kangoo, in Europe. It was sold alongside Renault's "Electri'cite" electric-drive Kangoo battery electric van. The Elect'Road had a 150 km range using a nickel-cadmium battery pack and a 500 cc, 16 kW liquid-cooled gasoline "range-extender" engine. It powered two high voltage/high output/low volume alternators, each of which supplied up to 5.5 kW at 132 V at 5000 rpm. The operating speed of the internal combustion engine (and therefore the output delivered by the generators) varied according to demand. The fuel tank had a capacity of 10 litres and was housed within the right rear wheel arch. The range extender function was activated by a switch on the dashboard. The onboard 3.5 kW charger could charge a depleted battery pack to 95% SOC in about four hours from 220 volts. Passenger compartment heat was powered by the battery pack as well as an auxiliary coolant circuit that was heated by the range extender engine. Renault sold about 500, primarily in France, Norway and the UK, for about 25,000 euros each and redesigned the Elect'road in 2007.

With support from the South Coast Air Quality Management District, the California Air Resources Board, the National Renewable Energy Laboratory, the Electric Power Research Institute, and Volkswagen, Alan Cocconi of AC Propulsion converted a Volkswagen Jetta into a plug-in series hybrid. The engine was replaced with a 120 kW electric motor and 8.7 kWh’s worth of lead–acid batteries, which were charged by a trunk-mounted 1.4-liter internal combustion engine from a Volkswagen Lupo.

Professor Frank's vehicles were shown at the Paris International Auto Show and demonstrated to about 200 Renault engineers at its Paris headquarters. In the same year, Toyota shipped Coulomb, a University of California Davis Plug-in Hybrid Electric Vehicle, to Toyota City to demonstrate it to about 250 engineers and executives at two of Toyota's primary Tier 1 suppliers, Koyo Seiko, and Aisin AW (Aisin built the 1998–2003 Toyota Prius hybrid transaxle, as well as those used in the Ford Escape Hybrid, Toyota Camry Hybrid, and Nissan Altima Hybrid).

2004

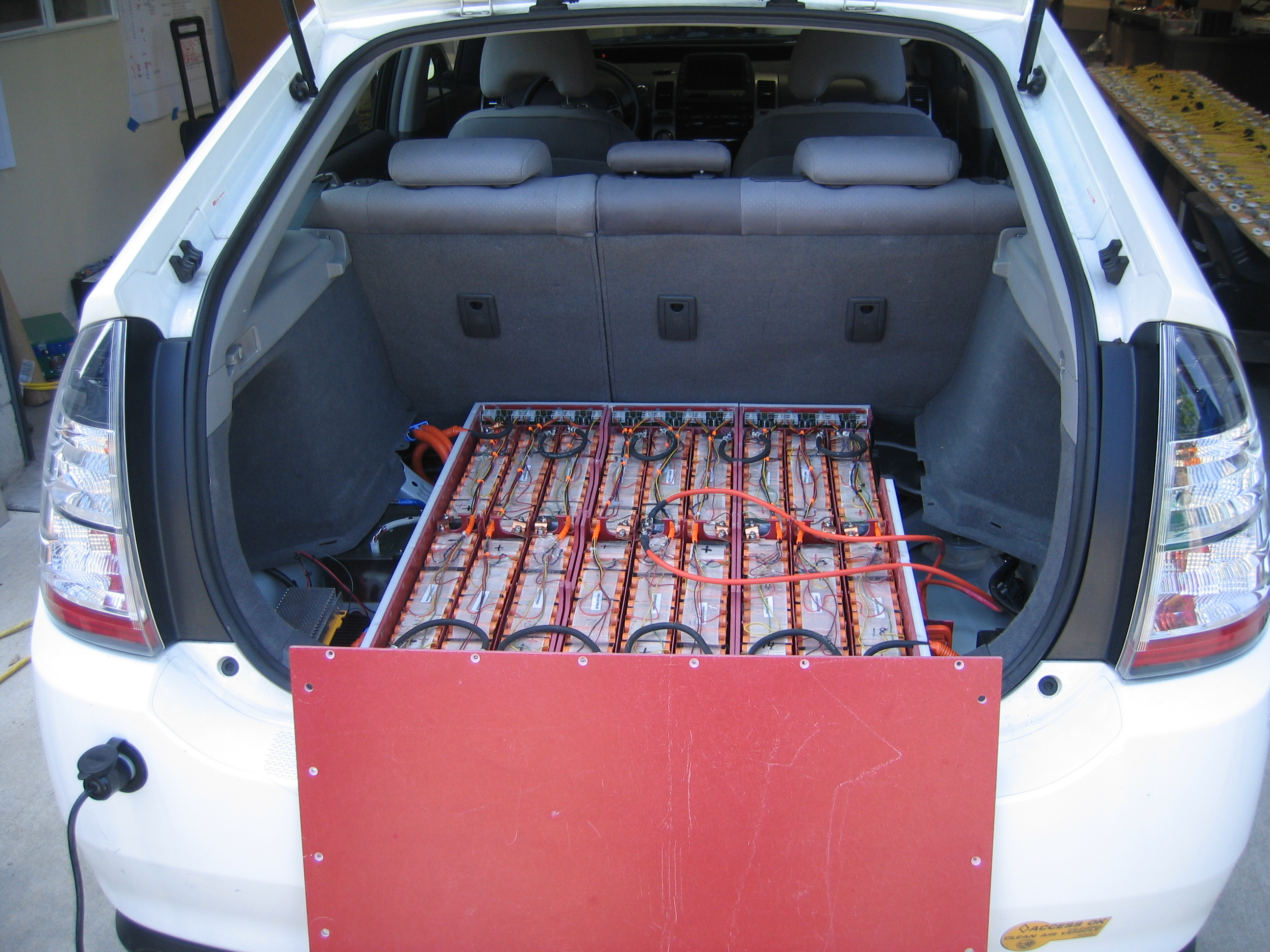
Lithium-ion battery pack, with cover removed, in the CalCars plug-in hybrid converted Toyota Prius.

In September, the California Cars Initiative converted a 2004 Toyota Prius into a prototype of what it calls the PRIUS+. With the addition of 130 kg (300 lb) of lead–acid batteries, the PRIUS+ achieved roughly double the gasoline mileage of a standard Prius and can make trips of up to 15 km (9.3 mi) using only electric power. The vehicle, which is owned by CalCars technical lead Ron Gremban, is used in daily driving, as well as a test bed for various improvements to the system.

Also in September, DaimlerChrysler displayed a plug-in hybrid version of its popular Mercedes-Benz Sprinter 311 CDI commercial van at the 2004 Internationale Automobil-Ausstellung Commercial Vehicle Show in Frankfurt, Germany. The diesel-engine PHEV Sprinters had a maximum all-electric range of 30 kilometers. Hand-built in Sindelfingen, Germany by Mercedes-Benz, the vehicles were tested around the clock, and some were placed in commercial fleet environments. The PHEV Sprinter's engine could be turned off by the driver for operation in historic European city centers that had outlawed internal-combustion engines.

By the end of the year, Dr. Frank's student teams had built and operated seven proof-of-concept and proof-of-demonstration prototype Plug-in Hybrid Electric Vehicles, including 6-passenger sedans (Taurus and Sable), Sport Utility Vehicles (Suburban, Explorer), two-seater sports car (GM EV1), and two ground-up 80 mpg sports cars, and the CalCars PRIUS+ prototype and EDrive Systems conversions were demonstrated.

2005

Additional DaimlerChrysler Mercedes-Benz Sprinter 15-passenger van PHEV prototypes were completed. EPRI, along with a number of utilities and government agencies, worked with DaimlerChrysler to deliver 4 Sprinter PHEV vans to test fleets.

In August, four companies – Raser Technologies, Maxwell Technologies, Electrovaya, and Pacific Gas and Electric – formed the Plug-In Hybrid Consortium to help reduce the research and design gap between component suppliers and OEMs and to accelerate the development of critical PHEV components. Since then, nine other component companies and three more utility companies, as well as CalCars and Plug In America, have joined the consortium.

== 2006 ==
At the UC Davis Hybrid Center, teams led by Professor Andrew A. Frank have been designing and building working prototypes, installed into a GM Equinox for the Challenge X competition.

PHEV conversions of Iveco medium-duty diesel-powered commercial vehicles, sold as Hybrid Daily Bimodales, are offered by Micro-Vett of Imola, Italy in truck, nine-passenger van, and 20-passenger school bus configurations. Micro-Vett offers their conversions with either lead–acid or lithium-ion battery packs, which have an advertised all-electric range of 25 kilometers, or 45 to 100 kilometers, respectively.

February: Hymotion, a Canadian company, introduced plug-in hybrid upgrade kits in February 2006. Designed for the Toyota Prius and the Ford Escape and Mariner Hybrids, these kits were offered to fleet buyers at first and are projected to be available to the general public in 2007.

April 14: Piaggio, the Italian manufacturer of Vespa scooters, announced that it had built two parallel-architecture plug-in hybrid prototypes based on the standard Vespa LX 50 and X8 125 models.

May 17: Representatives of academia, government, and the utility and auto industries testified before the House Science Subcommittee on Energy in support of proposed legislation that would advance the commercialization of plug-in hybrid electric vehicles.

May: Ryan Fulcher and Rich Rudman of Manzanita Micro converted Fulcher's Prius to a plug-in hybrid, using components that would lead to the introduction of a Manzanita Micro charger kit for PHEV conversions.

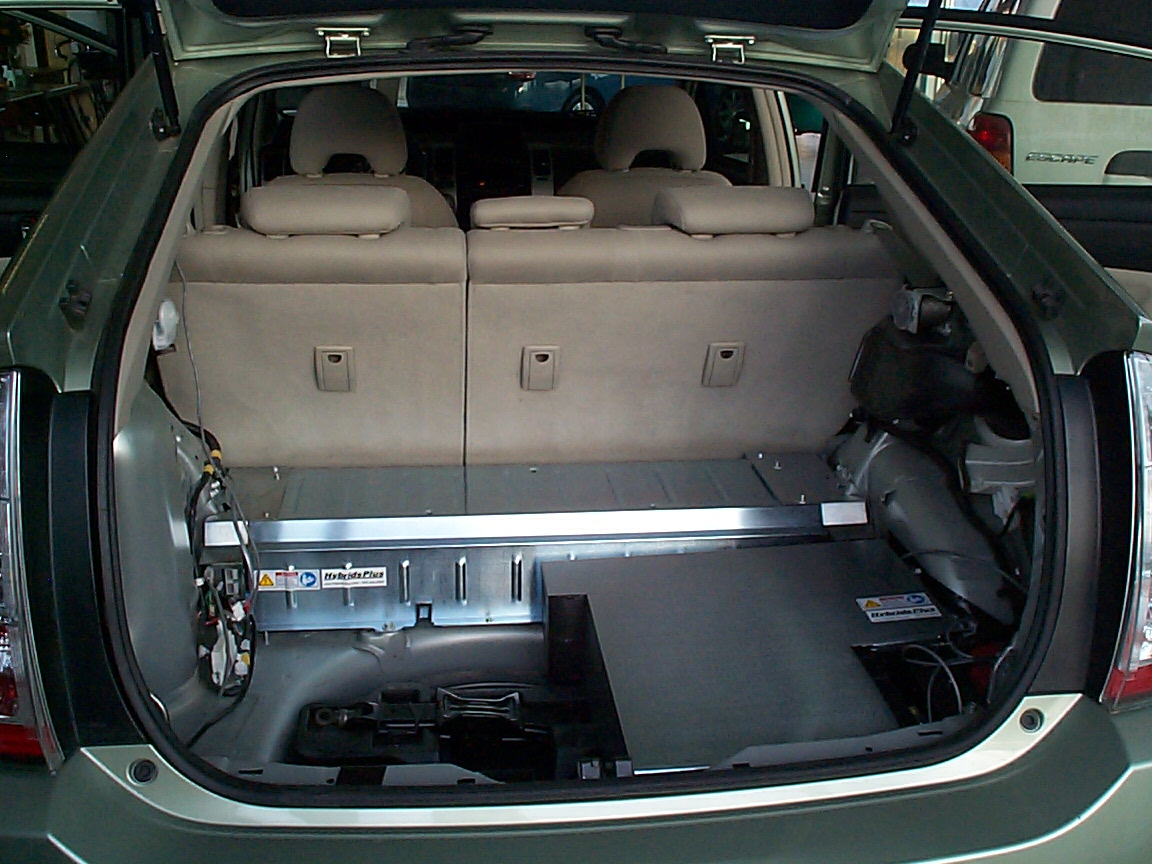
Hybrids Plus PHEV Toyota Prius with PHEV-15 pack in place of original pack and extension pack (for PHEV-30) on the side, retaining tire access.

July 5: Hybrids Plus of Boulder, Colorado began offering plug-in hybrid conversions of the 2004 and later Toyota Prius, using A123 Systems Li-ion batteries for either a 15 or 30-mile (48 km) all-electric range. Their first contract was with the Colorado Office of Energy Management and Conservation, which ordered one plug-in Prius conversion. The vehicle was handed over to Colorado OEMC on March 6, 2007.

July 18: Toyota announced that it "plans to develop a hybrid vehicle that will run locally on batteries charged by a typical 120-volt outlet before switching over to a gasoline engine for longer hauls." The next major update to the Toyota Prius is said to use lithium ion batteries. Toyota's fuel economy target for the upcoming next-generation Prius has been reported to be 40 kilometers/liter (2.5 L/100 km, or 94 mpg US.)

August: PML Flightlink unveiled an in-wheel, plug-in series hybrid conversion of a MINI at the British Motor Show, the MINI QED. PML claimed fuel economy of 80 mpg, 0 to 60 mph (97 km/h) in 4.5 seconds, top speed of over 150 mph (240 km/h), and a range of 1,000 miles (1,600 km).

November 1: Manzanita Micro sold their first PiPrius conversion kit using their PFC charger and battery regulator as a DC to DC converter and rapid battery charger system. Chelan County's Advanced Vehicle Initiative received the first conversion kit from Manzanita Micro in October 2006. As of April 2007 the fourth and fifth such conversions were underway.

November 29: GM announced plans to introduce a production plug-in hybrid version of Saturn's Greenline Vue SUV with an all-electric range of 10 miles (16 km).

== 2007 ==
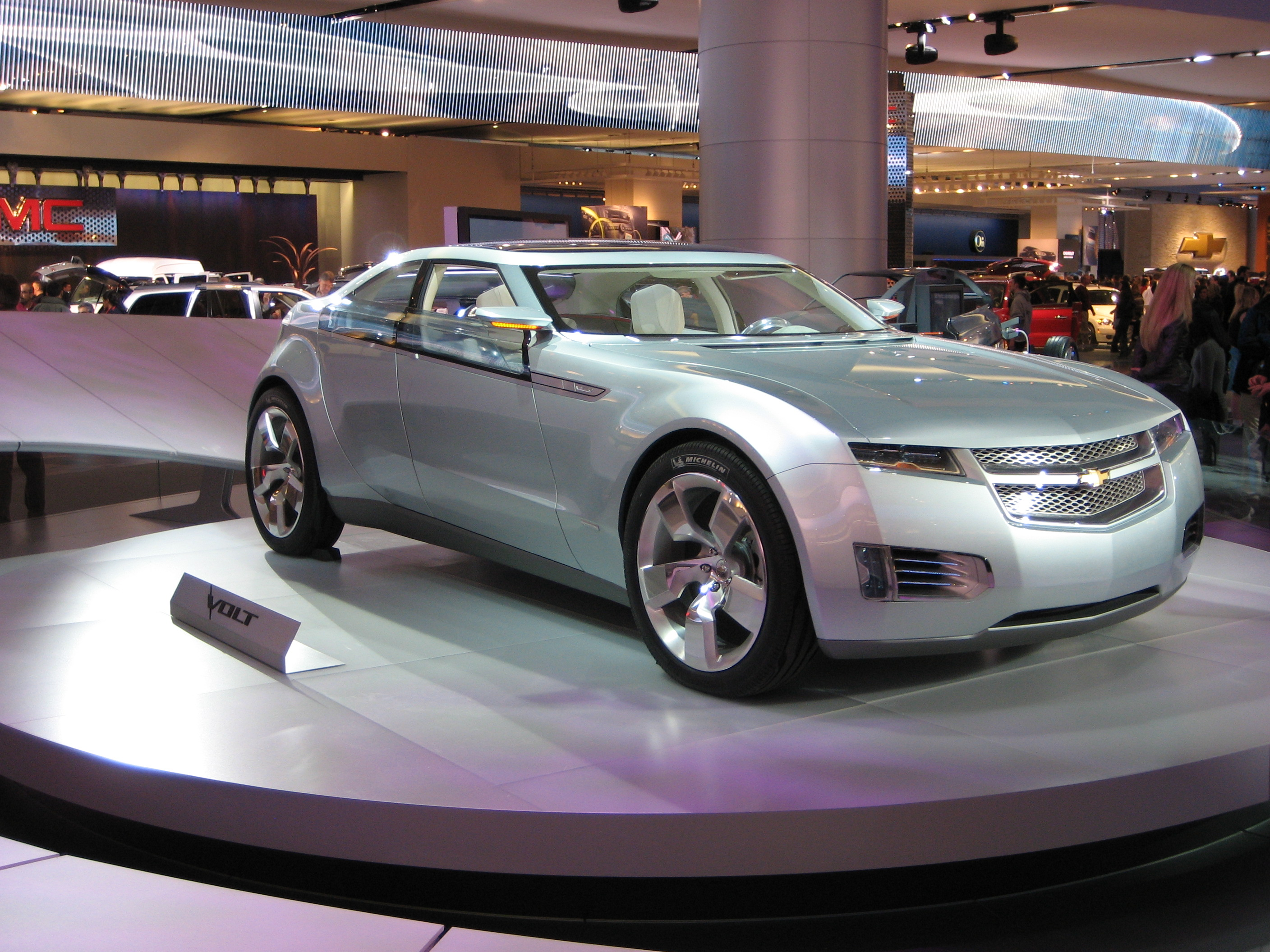

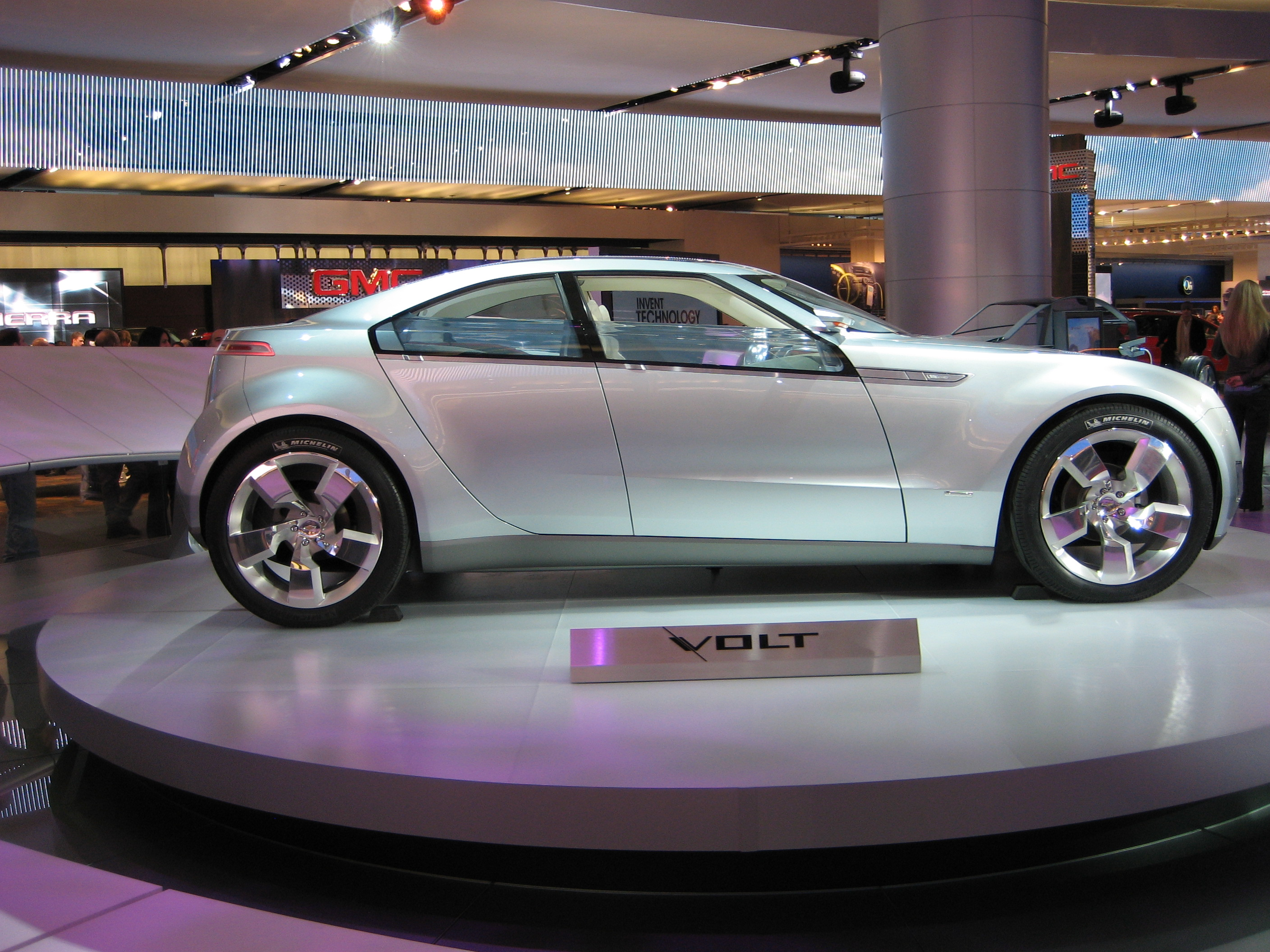
The Chevrolet Volt concept car was unveiled at the January 2007 North American International Auto Show.

January 7: General Motors' Chevrolet Volt was unveiled at Detroit's North American International Auto Show. The Volt is part of GM's E-Flex architecture, which is expected to initially feature a plug-in capable, battery-dominant series hybrid architecture. Future E-Flex plug-in hybrid vehicles may use gasoline, diesel, or hydrogen fuel cell power to supplement the vehicle's battery. General Motors envisions an eventual progression of E-Flex vehicles from plug-in hybrids to pure electric vehicles, as battery technology improves. General Motors presented the Volt as a PHEV-40 that starts its engine when 40% of the battery charge remains, and which can achieve a fuel economy of 50 mpg (4.7 L/100 km), even if the vehicle is not plugged in.

February 28: The United States Department of Energy released a draft of a plan to accelerate the development and deployment of plug-in hybrid vehicle technology. On May 22, five research projects were selected to receive $19 million to further the development of technologies related to PHEVs, such as electric motor power inverters.

March 2: The South Coast Air Quality Management District in California approved a $2.6-million contract for the conversion of 20 Ford Escape Hybrids and 10 Toyota Priuses to plug-in hybrids. The SCAQMD selected Quantum Technologies and Hymotion to perform the conversions.

March 14: The Illinois Institute of Technology delivered a converted plug-in Ford Escape Hybrid to the Chicago Department of Fleet Management for four to six months of field testing of the vehicle to evaluate the vehicle's performance, as well as improvements in fuel efficiency and emission reduction. The project is sponsored by the City of Chicago, MicroSun Technologies, ComEd, and All Cell, an Illinois Institute of Technology-based technology transfer company formed in 2001 to commercialize lithium-ion batteries in military, medical, portable, and transportation applications.

April 9: Pacific Gas and Electric, California's largest electric company, announced their support for plug-in hybrids with Vehicle to Grid capabilities. PG&E proposed regulatory changes which could allow homeowners to use such vehicles for back-up electricity in the event of a power failure.

April 23: The California Air Resources Board Independent Expert Panel on Zero Emission Vehicles published a report that assessed advanced vehicle technologies and concluded, among other things, that plug-in hybrids "have the potential to provide significant direct societal benefits and are likely to become available in the near future."

April 25: Phoenix Motorcars and UQM Technologies announced a collaborative project to develop a plug-in series hybrid version of the sport utility truck that Phoenix currently sells as an all-electric vehicle. The vehicle is projected to use a small gasoline-fueled internal combustion engine as a range extender and lithium titanate batteries from Altair Nanotechnologies.

May 1: A123Systems lithium-ion battery company CEO David Vieau announced that A123 plans to market battery packs in 2008 for third-party conversion of hybrids to plug-in hybrids.

May 2: CalCars announced that it had received a $200,000 grant from Google.org, the philanthropic arm of Google, for a two-year period to support its work in educating the public about plug-in hybrid-electric vehicles. In 2006, Google.org announced that it intended to develop a plug-in hybrid of its own.

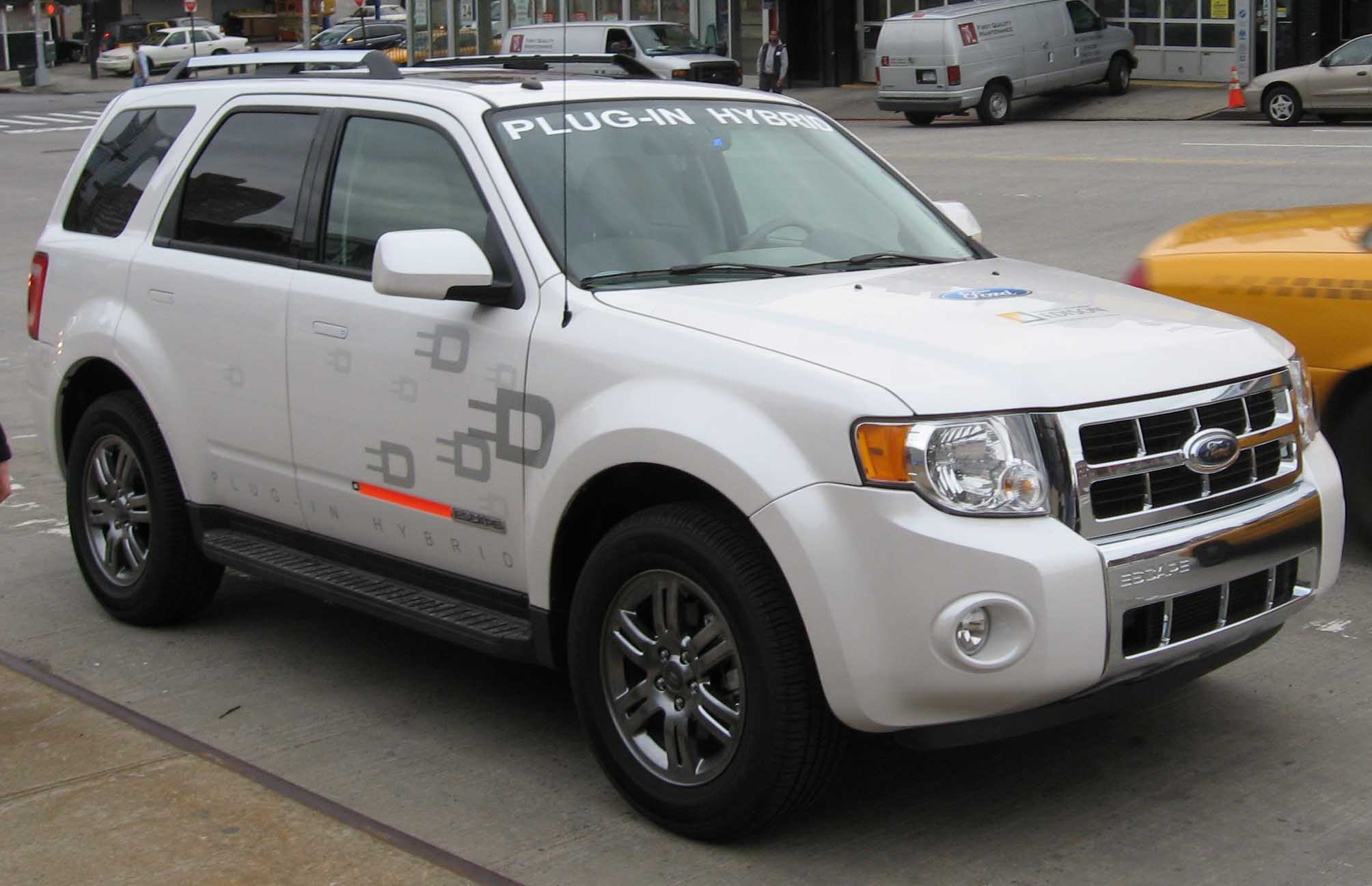
Ford Escape plug-in test vehicle.

July 9: Ford Motor Company CEO Alan Mulally said he expects Ford to sell plug-in hybrids in five to ten years, the time depending on advances in lithium-ion battery technology. Ford will provide Southern California Edison with twenty Ford Escape Hybrid sport utility vehicles reconfigured to work as plug-ins by 2009, with the first by the end of this year. Ford announced that it will team up with Southern California Edison to examine the future of plug-in hybrids in terms of how home and vehicle energy systems will work with the electrical grid.

July 18: Toyota requested permission from Japan's government to test a prototype plug-in Prius with a lithium-ion battery pack on public roads. After the test, Toyota is expected to lease them to government and municipal fleets, and may introduce the new model at the Tokyo Motor Show in November.

On July 25, 2007, Japan's Ministry of Land, Infrastructure and Transport certified Toyota's plug-in hybrid for use on public roads, making it the first automobile to attain such approval. Toyota plans to conduct road tests to verify its all-electric range. The plug-in Prius was said to have an all-electric range of 13 km (8 mi). But later prototypes shown at the 2008 Paris Auto Show had an electric-only range of "just a little over six miles."

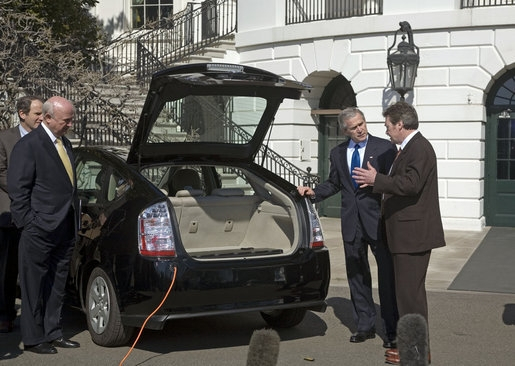
President Bush with A123Systems CEO on the White House South Lawn examining a Toyota Prius converted to plug-in hybrid with Hymotion technology.

August 9: General Motors vice president Robert Lutz said that GM is on track for Chevrolet Volt production to begin by 2010. Announcing an agreement with A123Systems, Lutz said GM would like to have their planned Saturn Vue plug-in on the roads by 2009.

September 5: Quantum Technologies and Fisker Coachbuild LLC announced the launch of a joint venture in Fisker Automotive. Fisker intends to build a US$80,000 luxury PHEV-50, the Fisker Karma, anticipated in late 2009.

September 6: Toyota announced that they reached an agreement with Electricite de France (EDF) to "jointly test prototype plug-in hybrid vehicles and develop electricity infrastructure for plug-ins".

September 11–23: The Frankfurt Auto Show features plug-in hybrids. The Volvo "Recharge" PHEV-60 concept car was unveiled, and General Motors Corporation exhibited the Opel Flextreme PHEV-34 concept car.

September 25: The United States Department of Energy is providing $17.2 million to further development of advanced batteries, and another $2 million for the study of future plug-ins. A cost-share with the United States Advanced Battery Consortium will allow up to $38 million in battery research and development.

October 9: Chinese manufacturer BYD, owned by China's largest mobile phone battery maker, announced that they would be introducing a production PHEV-60 sedan in China in the second half of 2008. BYD plans to exhibit it in January 2008 at the North American International Auto Show in Detroit. Based on BYD's midsize F6 sedan, it uses iron-based batteries instead of lithium-ion, and can be recharged to 70 percent of capacity in 10 minutes.

October 27: Venture Vehicles announced it would produce two versions of the three-wheeled VentureOne, an electric model with a range of 120 miles (190 km), and a 100 mpg PHEV version.

November 8: German Environmental Minister Sigmar Gabriel received a concept paper from Volkswagen CEO Martin Winterkorn about Volkswagen's attempts for electric drive and plug-in-hybrid technology.

== 2008 ==
On January 14, 2008, Toyota announced they would start selling lithium battery plug-in hybrids by 2010.

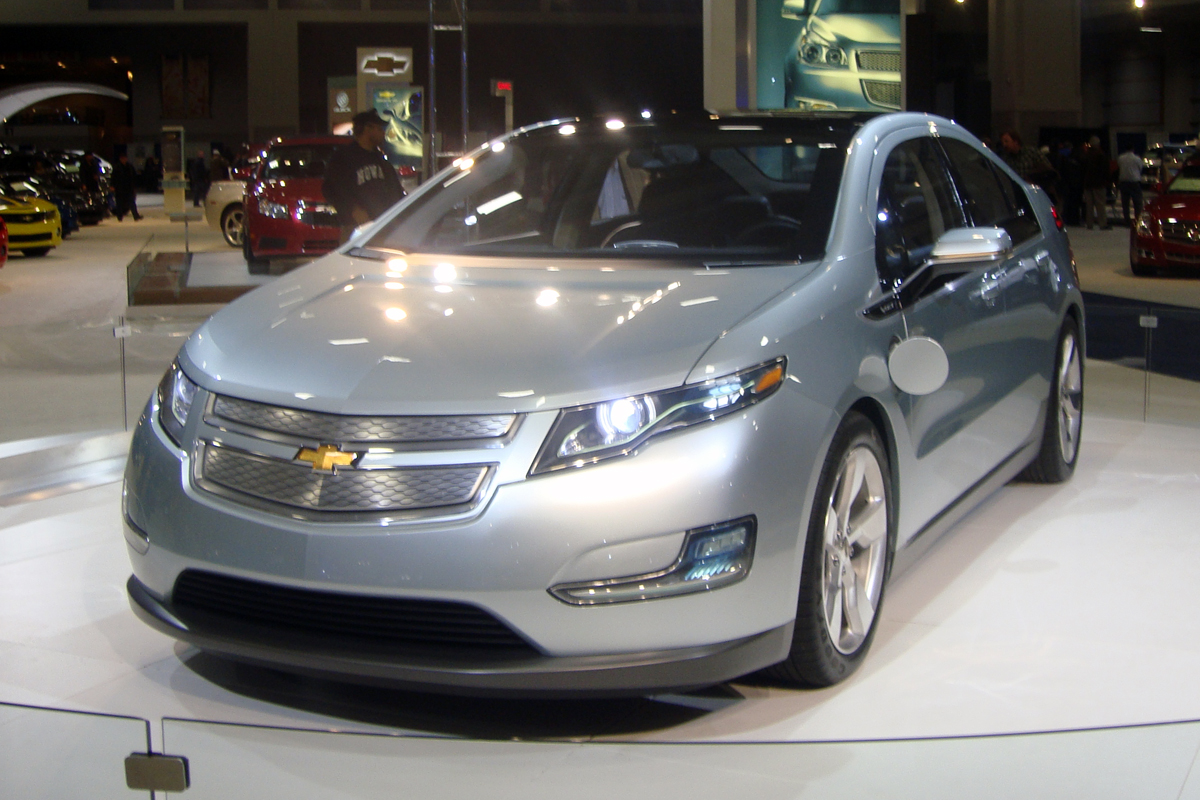
The production version of the Chevrolet Volt is able to run in all-electric mode up to 40 miles (64 km).

January 2008: A privately run waiting list to purchase the Chevrolet Volt reached 10,000 members. The list, administered by Lyle Dennis, was started one year prior.

January 2008: Assistant professor Yi Cui and colleagues at Stanford University's Department of Materials Science and Engineering have made a discovery to use silicon nanowires to give rechargeable lithium ion batteries 10 times more charge.

On February 7, 2008, Valence Technology announced it has entered into a contract with The Tanfield Group Plc (LSE: TAN) to manufacture and supply safe, Lithium Phosphate energy storage systems to power zero emission, all-electric commercial delivery vehicles. The Valence battery systems will be installed in leading-edge vans and trucks produced by Tanfield's UK-based trading division, Smith Electric Vehicles, the world's largest manufacturer of electric vans and trucks.

On March 27, 2008, the California Air Resources Board modified their regulations, requiring automobile manufacturers to produce 58,000 plug-in hybrids for sale to Californians during 2012 through 2014. This requirement is an asked-for alternative to an earlier mandate to produce 25,000 pure zero emission vehicles, reducing that requirement to 5,000.

April 2008: Raser and FEV series hybrid/extended range EV powertrain plan to have the first prototype vehicle ready to demonstrate in the third quarter of this year installed in a full-size SUV.

On June 4, 2008, Rick Wagoner, GM chairman and CEO announced mass production of the Chevy Volt beginning in late 2010. On June 5, 2008, Hymotion signed the first six dealers for its kits to convert Toyota Priuses into plug-in hybrids. On June 12, 2008, Ford urged the US Government to step up the evolution of plug-in hybrids.

On June 26, 2008, Volkswagen announced that they would be introducing production plug-ins based on the Golf compact. Volkswagen uses the term 'TwinDrive' to denote a PHEV.

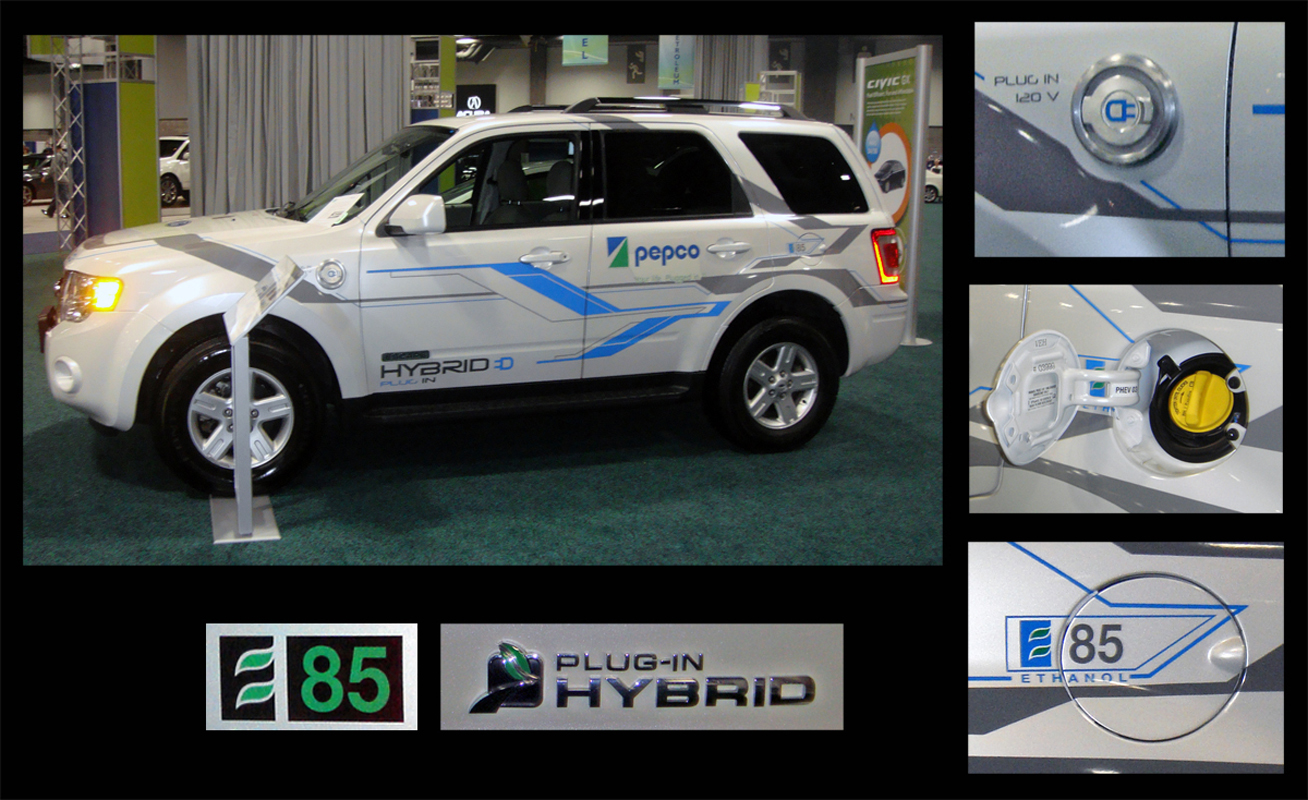
Demonstration Ford Escape E85 flex-fuel plug-in hybrid.

The production design model of the Chevrolet Volt was officially unveiled on September 16, 2008, as part of General Motors centennial celebration at the Wintergarden headquarters in Detroit. The production model differed greatly in design from the original concept car. The carmaker cited necessary aerodynamic changes needed to reduce the concept car's highdrag coefficient of Cd=0.43 down to a more efficient Cd=0.28.

In September 2008, Mazda was reported to be planning PHEVs. On September 23, 2008, Chrysler announced that they had prototyped a plug-in Jeep Wrangler and a Chrysler Town and Country mini-van, both PHEV-40s with series powertrains, and an all-electric Dodge sports car, and said that one of the three vehicles would go into production.

On October 3, the U.S. enacted the Energy Improvement and Extension Act of 2008 as part of the Emergency Economic Stabilization Act of 2008. The legislation provides tax credits of $2,500 plus $417 for each kilowatt-hour of battery capacity over 4 kilowatt-hours, up to $7,500 for cars under 10,000 pounds, $10,000 for larger vehicles under 14,000 pounds, $12,500 for bigger trucks under 26,000 pounds, or $15,000 for larger trucks and equipment. The tax credit will be phased out two calendar quarters after the first 250,000 such vehicles are sold, down to 50% for the next six months and 25% for another half year after that.

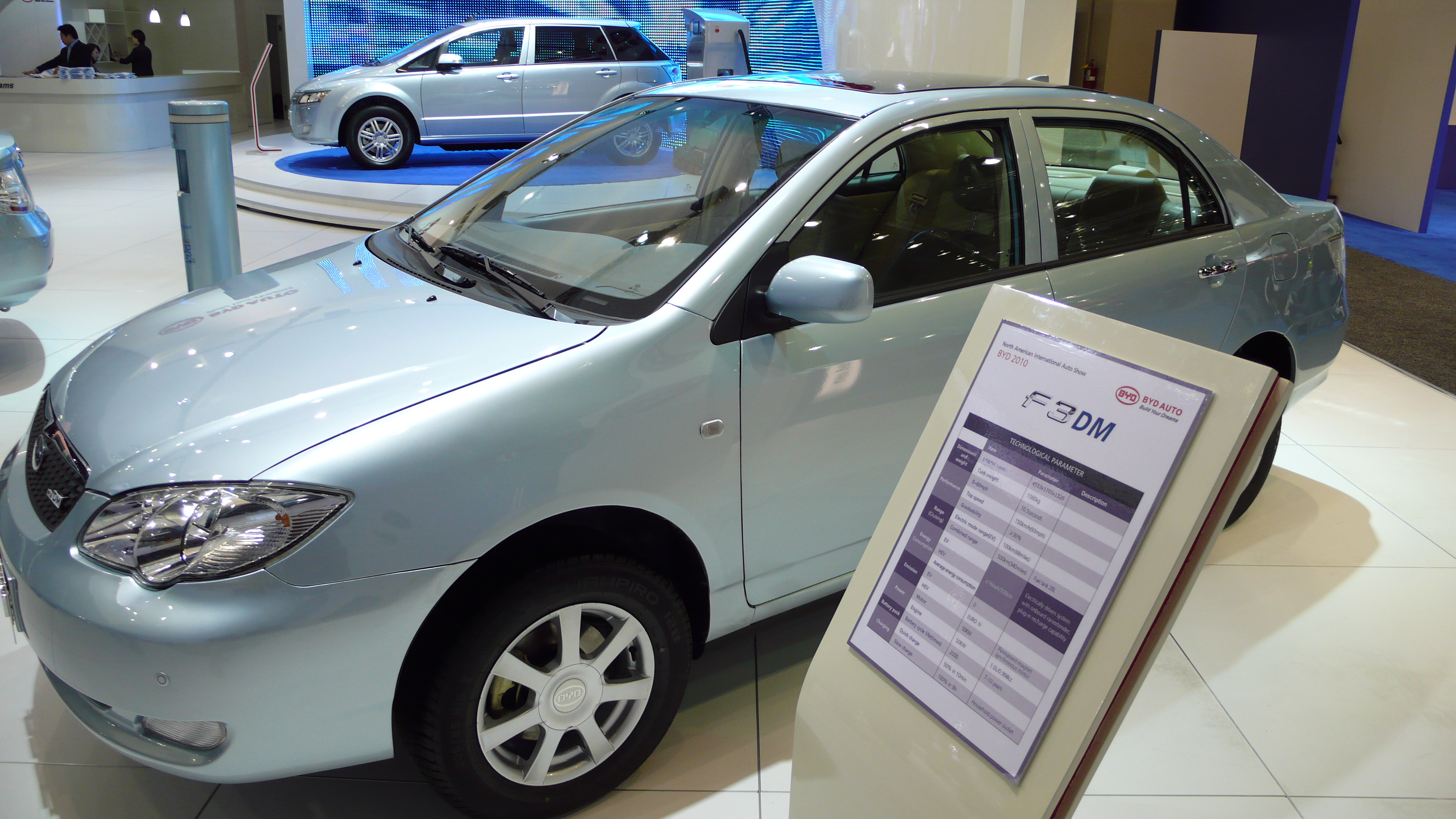
The F3DM began sales in China in December 2008.

In mid-October, the Wall Street Journal reported that BYD Auto's PHEV-60 F3DM sedan will be available by November in China. It will sell for equivalent of US$22,000 and has a 110 km electric-mode driving range.

As a demonstration project, Ford delivered in 2008 the first flexible-fuel plug-in hybrid SUV to the U.S. Department of Energy (DOE), a Ford Escape Plug-in Hybrid, capable of running on gasoline or E85.

On December 15, 2008, BYD Auto's F3DM PHEV-60 sedan began selling in China as the first production plug-in hybrid, the first ever sold in the world. It costs the equivalent of US$22,000 and has a 100 km (62 mi) electric-mode driving range. During its first year in the market the F3DM plug-in sold only 48 vehicles.

== 2009 ==
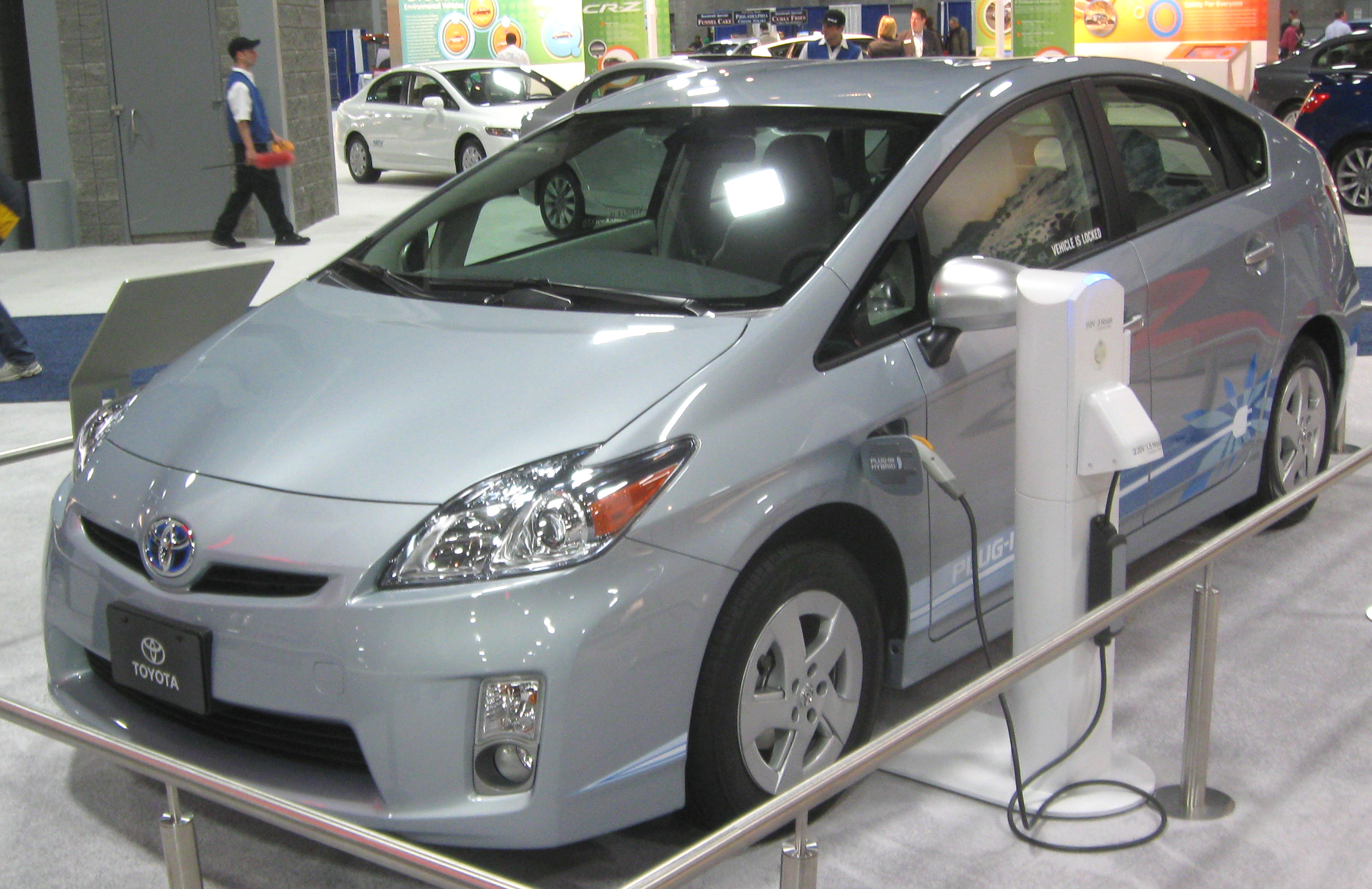
Demonstration Toyota Prius Plug-in Hybrid produced for real-world testing

On June 1, 2009, Volvo announced the launching of series production diesel-electric plug-in hybrids by 2012. The company plans to sell a series hybrid with the goal of achieving emissions of less than 50 grams of CO_{2} per kilometer. Two Volvo V70 demonstrators were converted to PHEVs and are undergoing a test trial in real world conditions since December 2009. This demonstration project is a joint venture with Vattenfall, a Swedish energy company. As reported by the test drivers, the V70 Plug-in Hybrid demonstrators have an all-electric range between 20 kilometres (12 mi) to 30 kilometres (19 mi). The test plug-in hybrids were built with a button to allow test drivers to manually choose between electricity or diesel engine power at any time.

The first pre-production test car based on the final Chevrolet Volt design was built in June 2009, in Warren, Michigan, and by October 2009, 80 Volts had been built and were tested under various conditions.

During its first eight months in the Chinese market, the BYD F3DM PHEV-60 sold less than 100 vehicles. Sales of the F3DM began in Hong Kong in June 2009.

== 2010 ==
A global demonstration program involving 600 Toyota Prius Plug-in pre-production test cars began in late 2009 in Japan and by mid-2010 field testing had begun in France, Germany, the United Kingdom, Canada, and the United States. The commercial version is expected to cost between US$3,000 to US$5,000 more than the conventional Prius and Toyota announced it expects to sell 20,000 units a year initially.

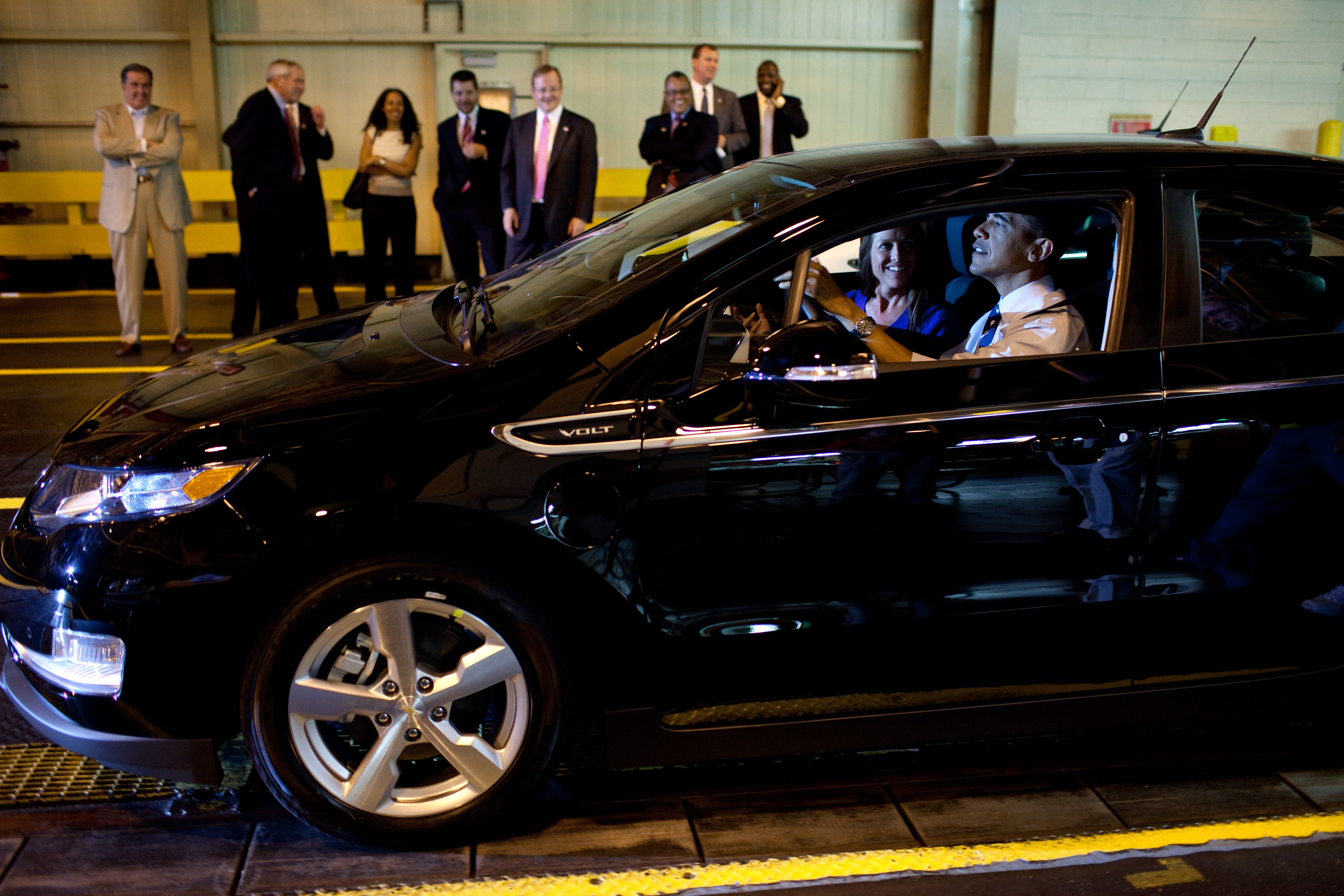
President Barack Obama behind the wheel of a Chevy Volt plug-in during his tour of the General Motors Auto Plant in Hamtramck, Michigan.

Sales of the BYD F3DM to the general public began in Shenzhen in March 2010, and only 417 units were sold during 2010.

On March 31, 2010, the first factory-built Chevrolet Volt was produced at the Detroit Hamtramck Assembly Plant in order to test the production line and for quality control purposes, both of the tooling and the pre-production vehicles produced before regular production began.

In October 2010, Lotus Engineering unveiled the Lotus CityCar at the 2010 Paris Motor Show, a plug-in series hybrid concept car designed for flex-fuel operation on ethanol, or methanol as well as regular gasoline. The lithium battery pack provides an all-electric range of 60 kilometres (37 mi), and the 1.2-liter flex-fuel engine kicks in to allow to extend the range to more than 500 kilometres (310 mi).

Henrik Fisker showed the first production model of the Fisker Karma at the 2010 Paris Motor Show.

General Motors began deliveries of the Chevrolet Volt in the United States in December 2010. The Volt has an all-electric range of 35 miles (56 km) according to the United States Environmental Protection Agency. A total of 326 Volts were delivered to retail customers during 2010.

== 2011 ==
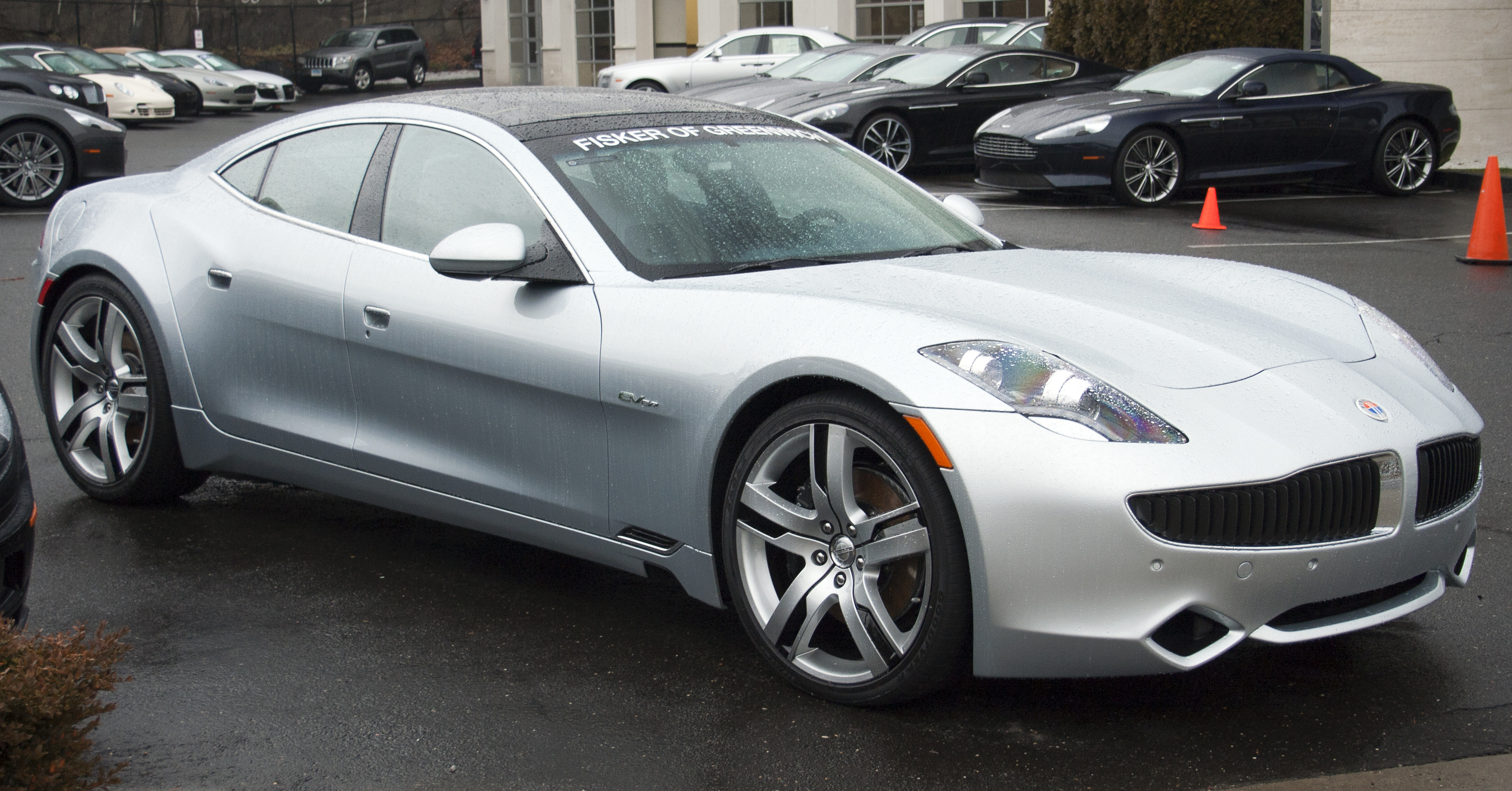
Retail deliveries of the Fisker Karma began in November 2011.

Fisker Automotive initially scheduled sales of its Karma PHEV by the fourth quarter of 2009 in the U.S., and starting in 2010 in Europe. After rescheduling the Fisker Karma market launch to September 2010, and missing its target to build 70 to 100 test cars in 2010, production began in July 2011. The Valmet plant in Finland began production with five cars a week. By December 2011 the production rate was 25 units a day. The first deliveries of the Fisker Karma, with an all-electric range of 32 miles (51 km), took place in the U.S. in July 2011. Karma deliveries to retail customers began in November 2011.

Chrysler began in 2011 field testing of the Dodge Ram 1500 Plug-in Hybrid in the United States with 140 units. The plug-in pickups were allocated to local and state governments, utility companies, and a U.S. Army base. This is demonstration program only, and Chrysler stated it has no plans for a production version. The Ram PHEV has an EV range of 20 mi (32 km).

BYD Auto reported sales over 1,000 BYD F3DMs by October 2011. Cumulative sales of the Chevrolet Volt in the U.S. and Canada reached 8,272 units through December 2011.

== 2012 ==
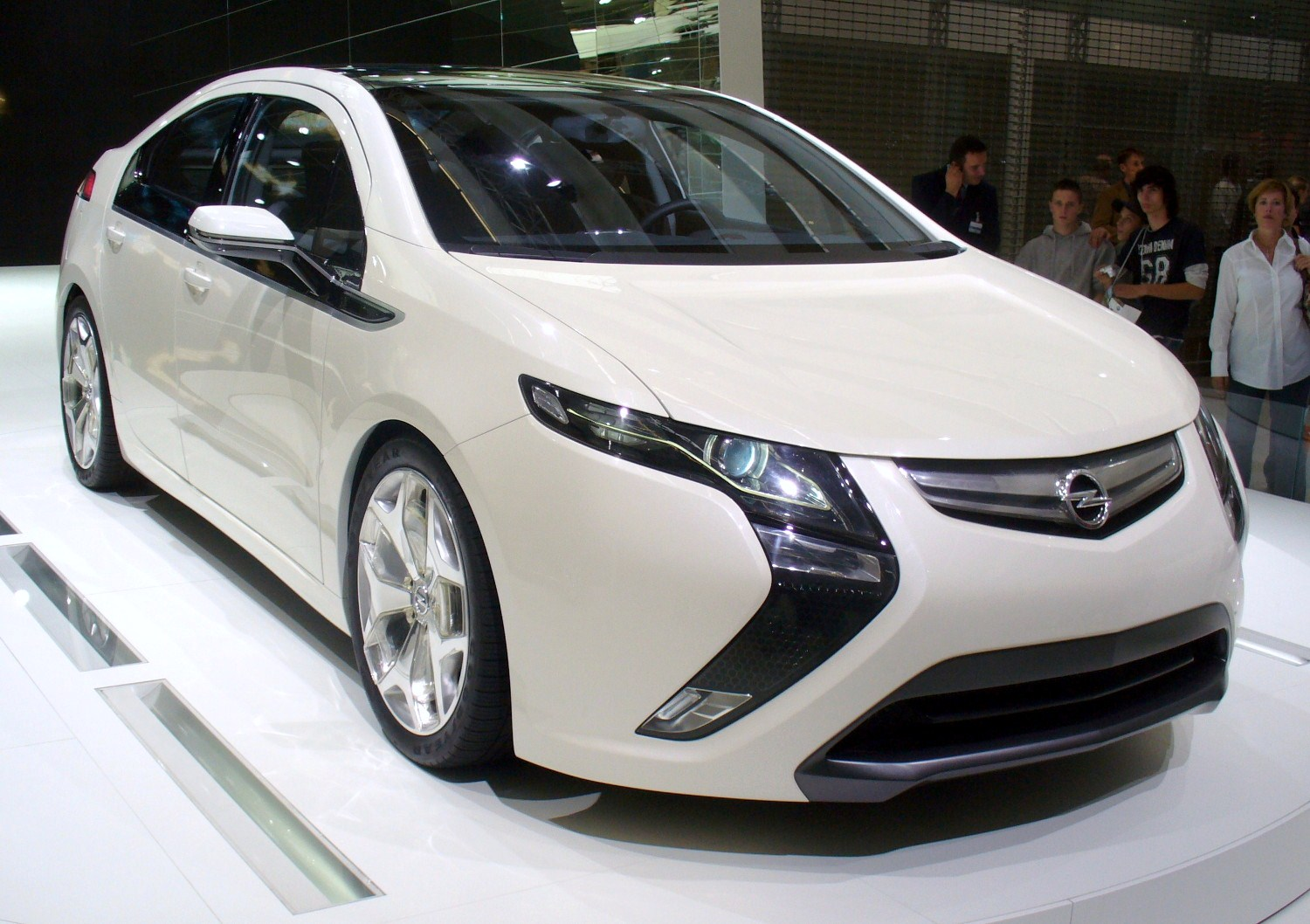
Deliveries of the Opel Ampera in Europe began in February 2012.

The European version of the Volt, the Opel Ampera, was released to customers in Europe in February 2012. Opel reported that most of the Ampera clients are fleet or business customers. Deliveries of the right-hand drive Vauxhall Ampera in the UK began in May 2012. As of October 2012, more than 33,000 units of the Volt/Ampera family have been sold worldwide. The United States is the world's top selling market with 19,309 Volts sold during the first ten months of 2012, and cumulative sales of 27,306 units since December 2010. The second best selling market is the Netherlands with 2,175 Amperas and 241 Volts sold through October 2012. Canada ranks third with 1,075 Volts sold during 2012 and cumulative sales of 1,350 units between September 2011 and October 2012, followed by Germany with 1,012 Amperas and 48 Volts registered through October 2012.

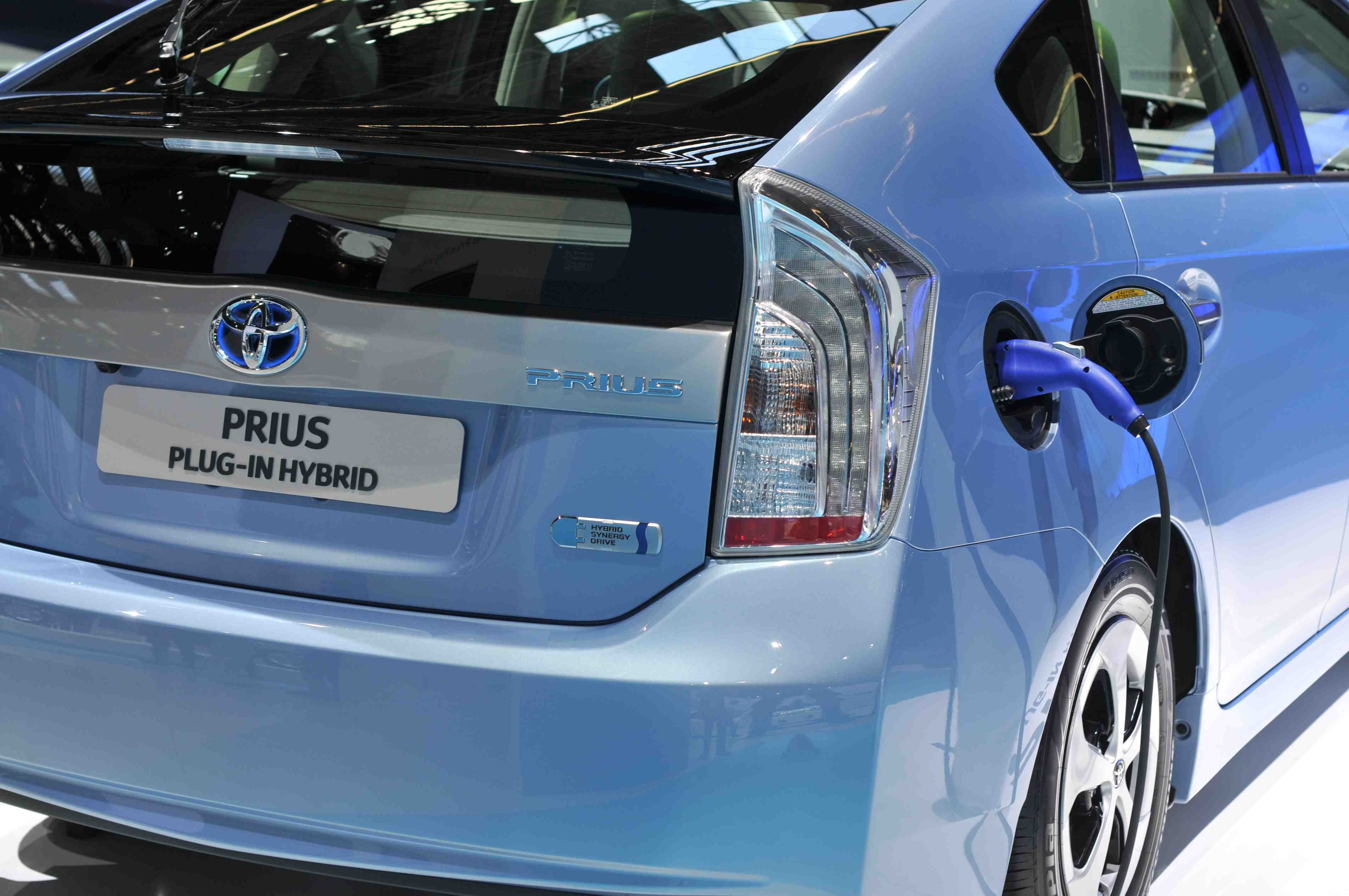
Production version of the 2012 Toyota Prius Plug-in Hybrid.

The Toyota Prius Plug-in Hybrid was released in Japan in January 2012, followed by the United States in February 2012, and Europe in June 2012. As of 31 October 2012, a total of 21,600 Prius PHVs have been sold worldwide, with 9,623 units sold in the United States through October 2012, followed by Japan with 9,500 units sold through October 2012, and 1,867 units sold in Europe through September 2012.

In April 2012, BYD Auto announced that due to its low sales, the F3DM will be replaced by the BYD Qin (pronounced "Chin") plug-in hybrid, which was unveiled at the 2012 Beijing International Automotive Exhibition.

A two-year demonstration program with 25 Chrysler Town & Country E85 flexible-fuel plug-in minivans began in April 2012. The first units were delivered in Auburn Hills, Michigan and Charlotte, North Carolina. The demonstration program was halted in September 2012, and Chrysler recalled the 23 units deployed at the time due to damage sustained by three separate Dodge Ram 1500 Plug-in Hybrids participating in a parallel program when their battery packs overheated. The carmaker plans to upgrade the battery packs shared by both vehicles with cells that use a different lithium-ion chemistry before the vehicles go back on service. No minivans were involved in any incidents.

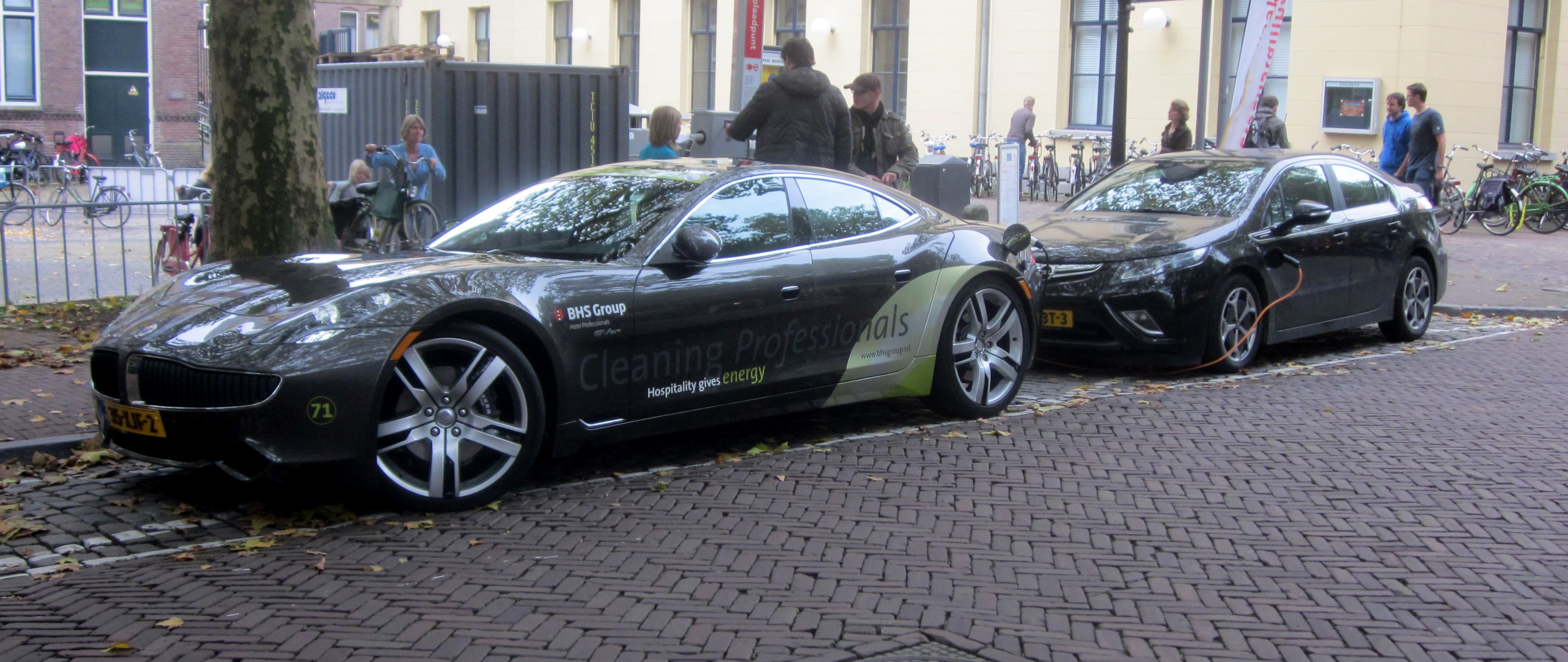
A Fisker Karma and an Opel Ampera charging in Utrecht, the Netherlands.

Fisker Automotive reported that around 1,500 units have been delivered in the U.S. and Europe by September 2012. The Netherlands, with 138 units sold through October 2012, is the top selling European market for the Karma.

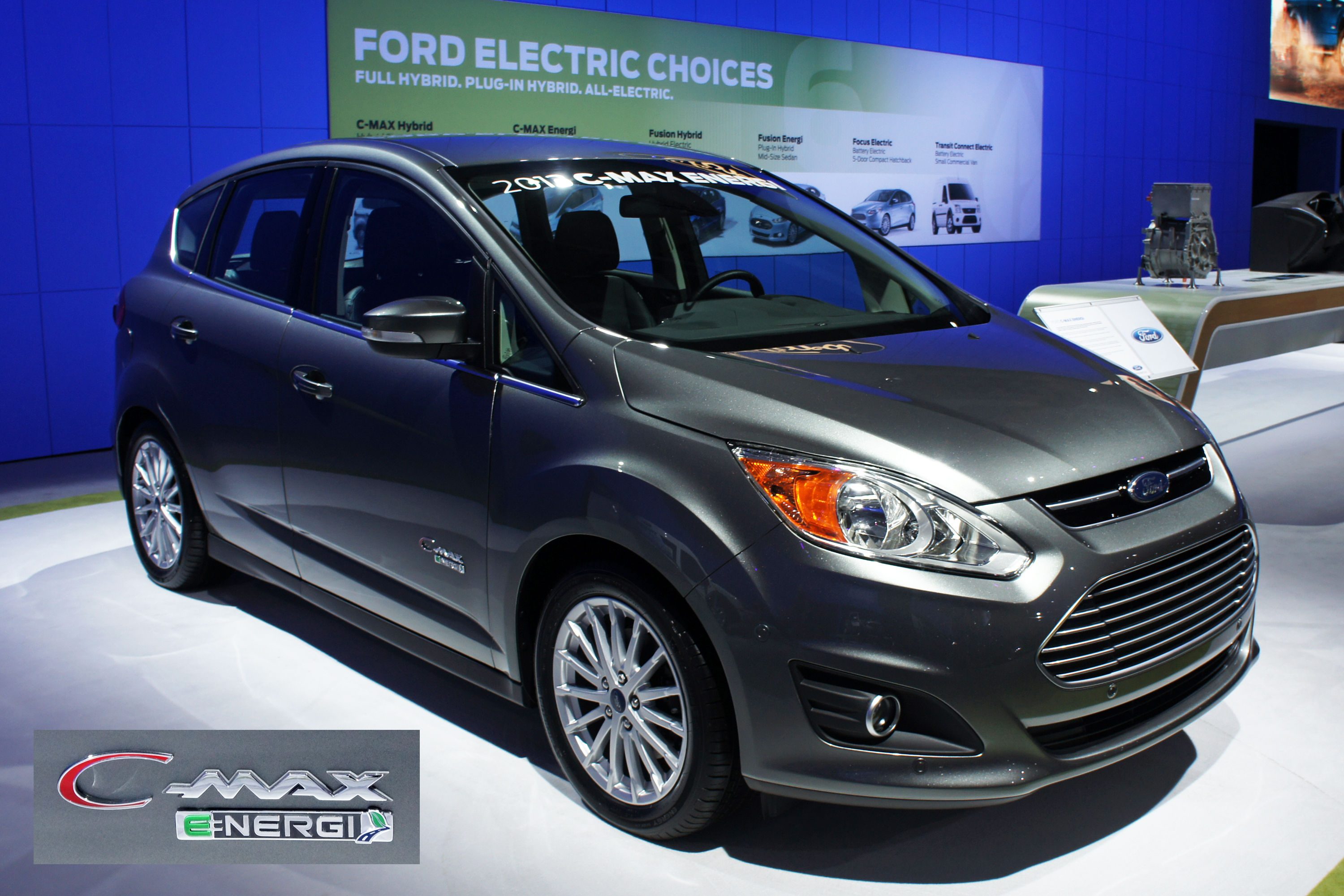
The Ford C-Max Energi was released in the U.S. in October 2012.

Sales of plug-in hybrid cars in the Netherlands during 2012 have been notable, as PHEV sales took the lead over all-electric cars during the first nine months of 2012. In addition to the Opel Ampera ranking as the best selling electric-drive car with 1,927 units sold during 2012, the Prius Plug-in Hybrid ranks second, with 610 units sold between June and September 2012, and the Chevrolet Volt ranks third with 205 units sold during the first months of the year. Adding 134 Fisker Karmas sold during 2012, the group of plug-in hybrid cars leads the Dutch market with 2,876 units sold during the first nine months of 2012, representing more than 80% of passenger EV sales in the country during this period. As of September 2012, the Nissan Leaf was the top selling all-electric car in the country, with 163 units sold during the year, and a total of 457 units sold in the Netherlands since their introduction in mid-2011.

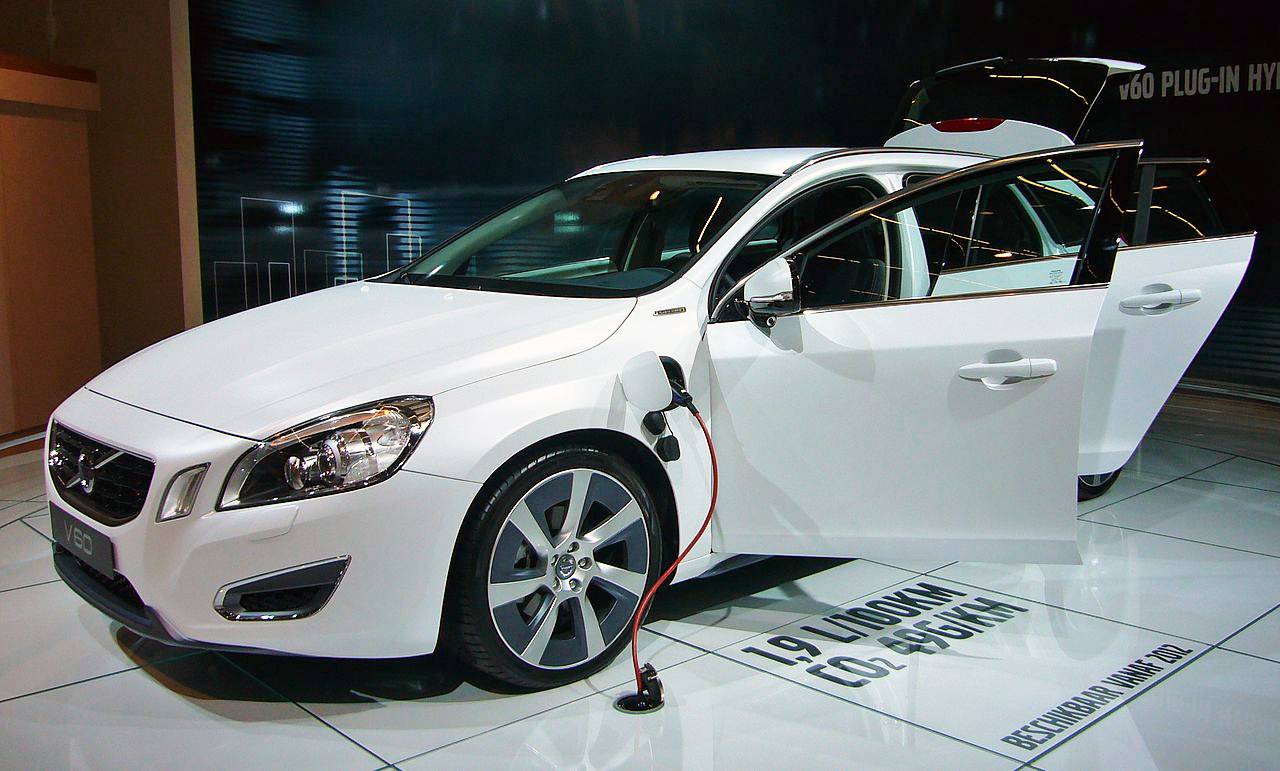
The Volvo V60 Plug-in Hybrid is the world's first diesel plug-in hybrid.

Deliveries of the Ford C-Max Energi began in the U.S. by mid October 2012. The C-Max Energi has an all-electric range of 21 mi (34 km) and initially, an EPA rating for combined city/highway fuel economy in all-electric mode of 100 MPG-e (2.4 L/100 km). Later, due to complaints from owners not achieving the sticker fuel economy, and following a technical review, the official EPA rating in EV mode was downgraded to 88 MPG-e (2.7 L/100 km). In a similar way, initially the EPA rating in hybrid-gasoline mode was 43 mpg_{‑US} (5.5 L/100 km; 52 mpg_{‑imp}), but it was later downgraded to 38 mpg_{‑US} (6.2 L/100 km; 46 mpg_{‑imp}).

The Volvo V60 Plug-in Hybrid, the world's first diesel plug-in hybrid, was released in Sweden by late 2012. Deliveries in the rest of Europe started in 2013. Almost 8,000 units were sold in 2013.

== 2013 ==
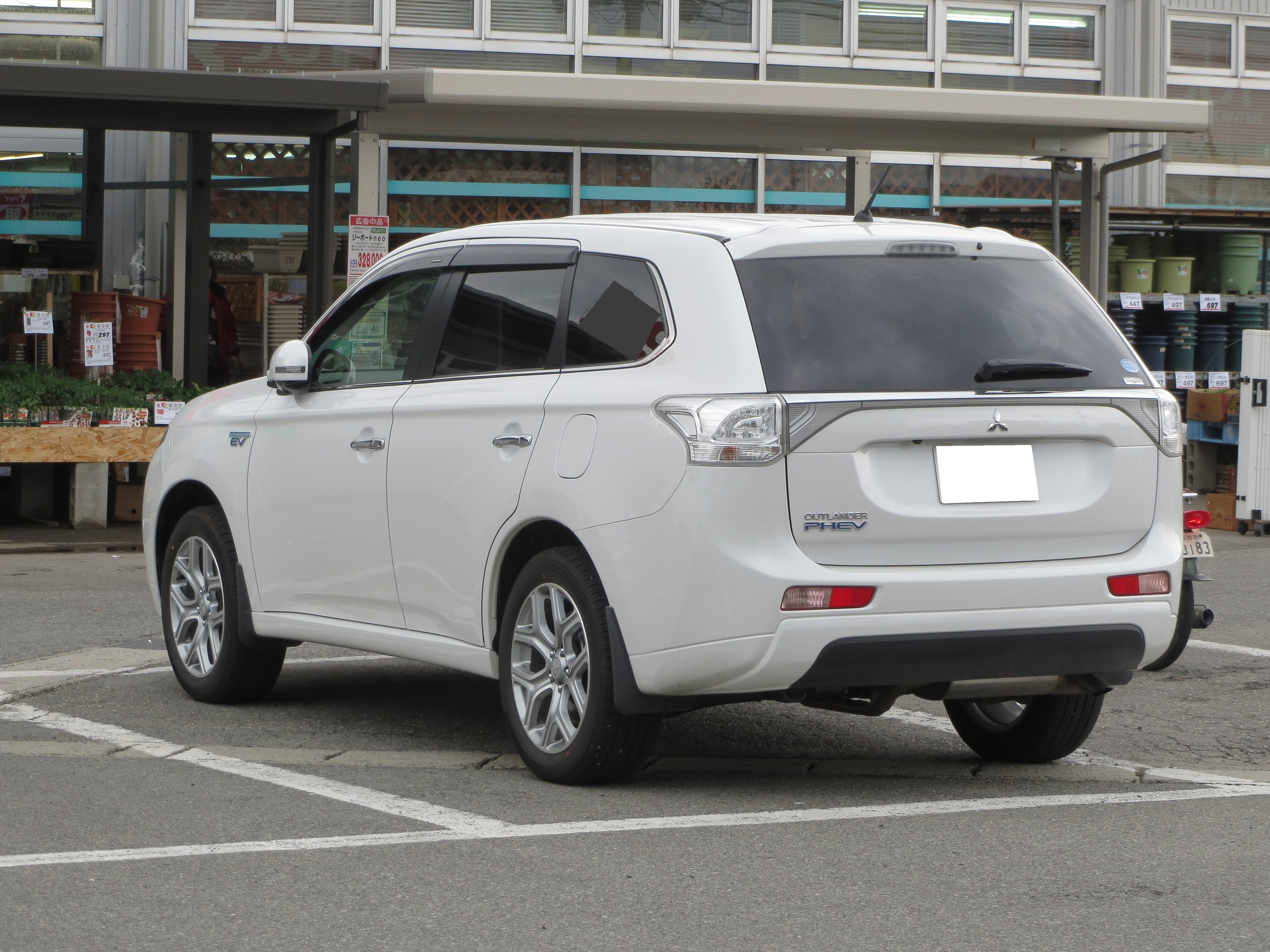
The Mitsubishi Outlander P-HEV was released in Japan in January 2013.

Sales of the Honda Accord Plug-in Hybrid began in the U.S. in January 2013, and availability is limited to California and New York. The Accord PHEV was introduced in Japan in June 2013 and it is available only for leasing, primarily to corporations and government agencies. The Mitsubishi Outlander P-HEV was released in the Japanese market also in January 2013, becoming the first SUV plug-in hybrid in the market. The European version was released in Europe in October 2013. The introduction in the United States was delayed until 2015 due to problems in the initial production batch. Over 25,000 units have been sold through April 2014, with 13,498 units sold in Japan followed by the Netherlands with 10,951 units, where the Outlander P-HEV ranked for two months in-a-row, November and December 2013, as the top selling new car in the country. As of September 2014, the Outlander P-HEV is the top registered plug-in electric car in the Netherlands with 14,567 units.

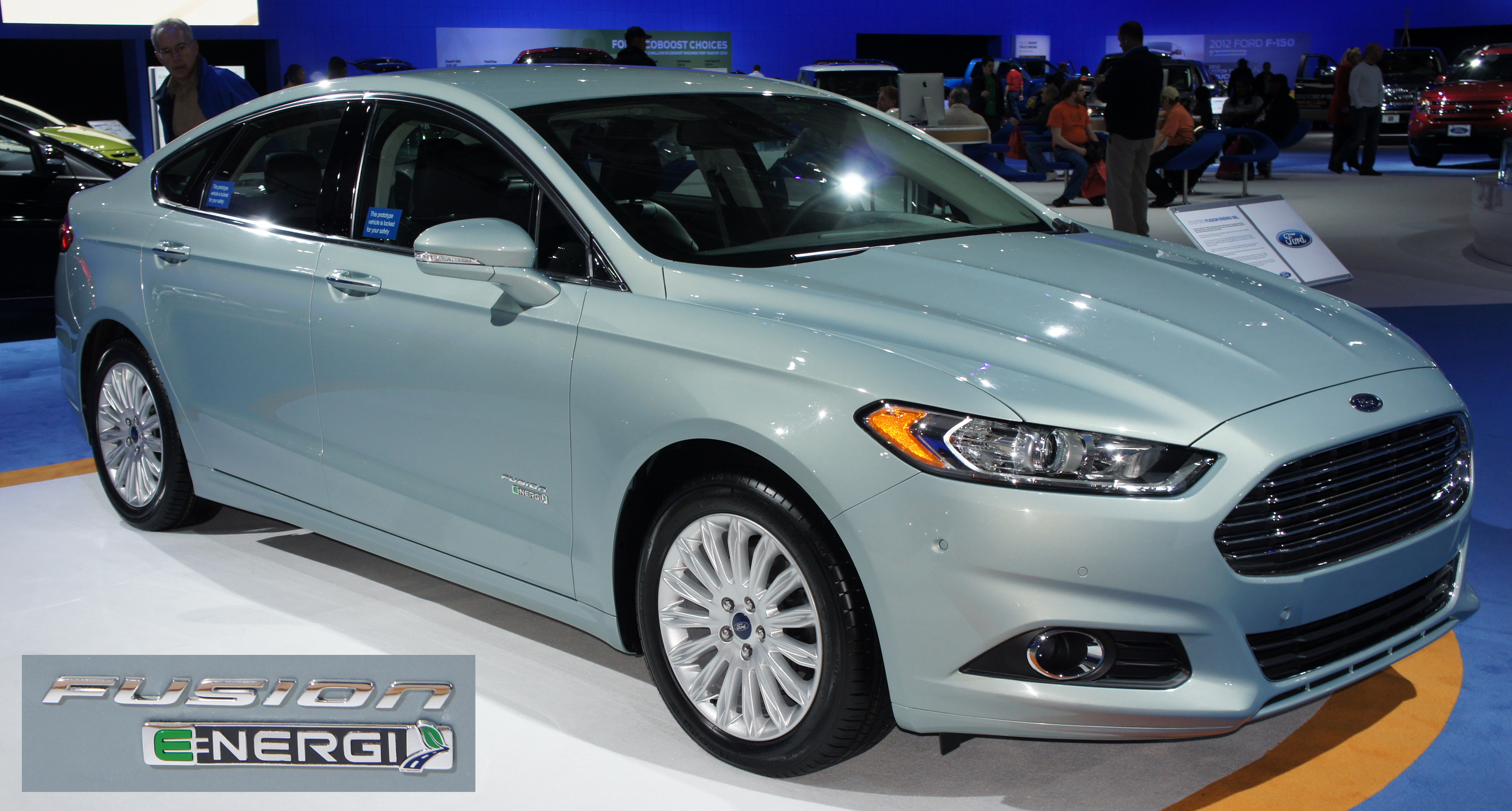
Deliveries of the Ford Fusion Energi began in the U.S. in March 2013.

The Ford Fusion Energi was released in the U.S. market by late February 2013, and retail deliveries began in March 2013. A total of 6,089 units were sold in the U.S. in 2013. Deliveries to retail customers of the limited edition McLaren P1 supercar began in the UK in October 2013. The first P1 delivery in the U.S. occurred in May 2014. The Porsche Panamera S E-Hybrid was released in the U.S. market in November 2013. The first retail deliveries of the Cadillac ELR took place in the U.S. in December 2013.

BYD Auto ended production of its BYD F3DM due to low sales, and sold the remaining inventory through October 2013. Its successor, the BYD Qin, began sales in Costa Rica in November 2013, with sales in other countries in Latin America scheduled to begin in 2014. Qin deliveries began in China in mid December 2013. The Qin ranked as the top selling plug-in electric car in China during the first quarter of 2014.

== 2014 ==
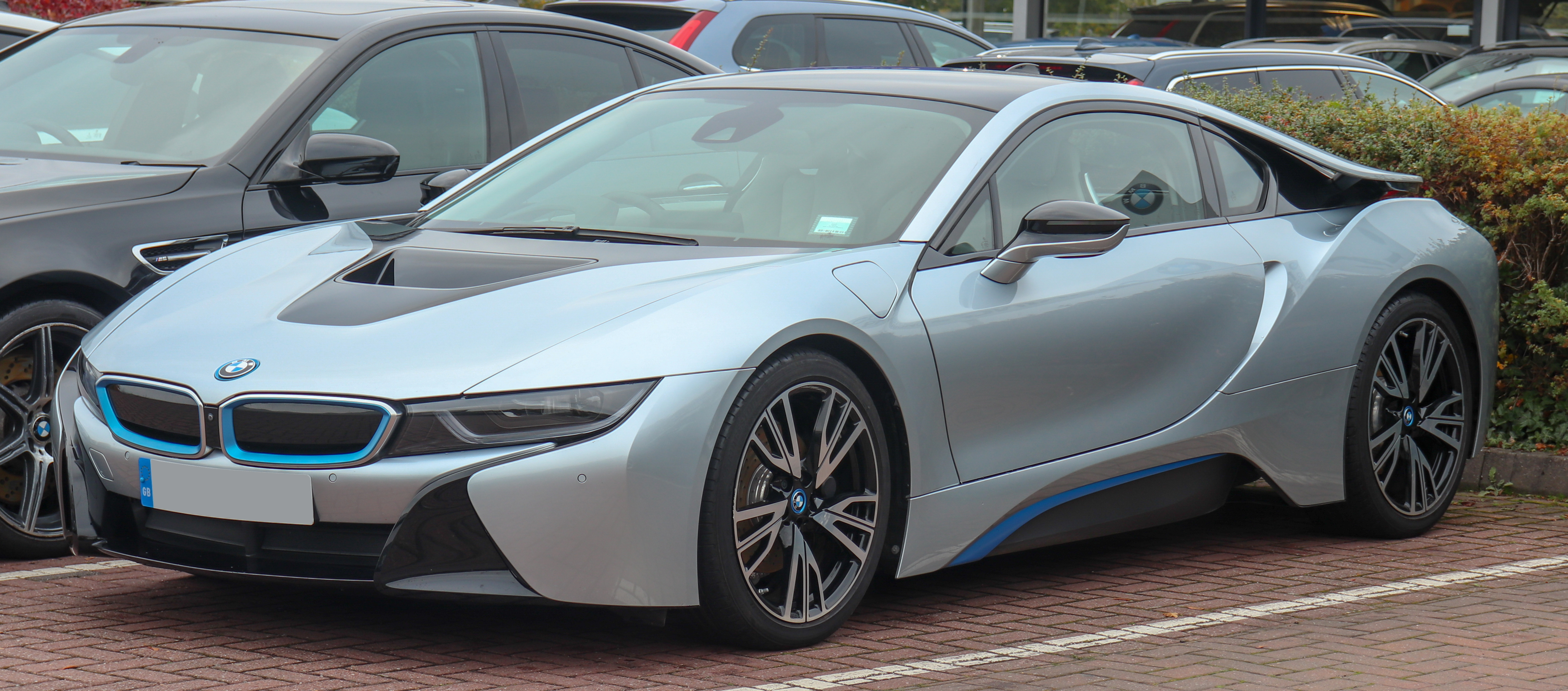
The BMW i8 plug-in hybrid was released to retail customers in Germany in 2014.

The BMW i8 and the limited edition Volkswagen XL1 were released to retail customers in Germany in June 2014. The XL1 is available only in Europe and production is limited to 250 units. Volkswagen expects its diesel-powered XL1 to achieve 0.9 L/100 km (260 mpg_{‑US}), becoming the most fuel-efficient car in the world.

Retail deliveries of the Porsche 918 Spyder began in Europe in May 2014. Deliveries in the United States began in June 2014. The first units of the Audi A3 Sportback e-tron, Volkswagen Golf GTE and Mercedes-Benz S 500 Plug-in Hybrid were registered in Germany in August 2014.

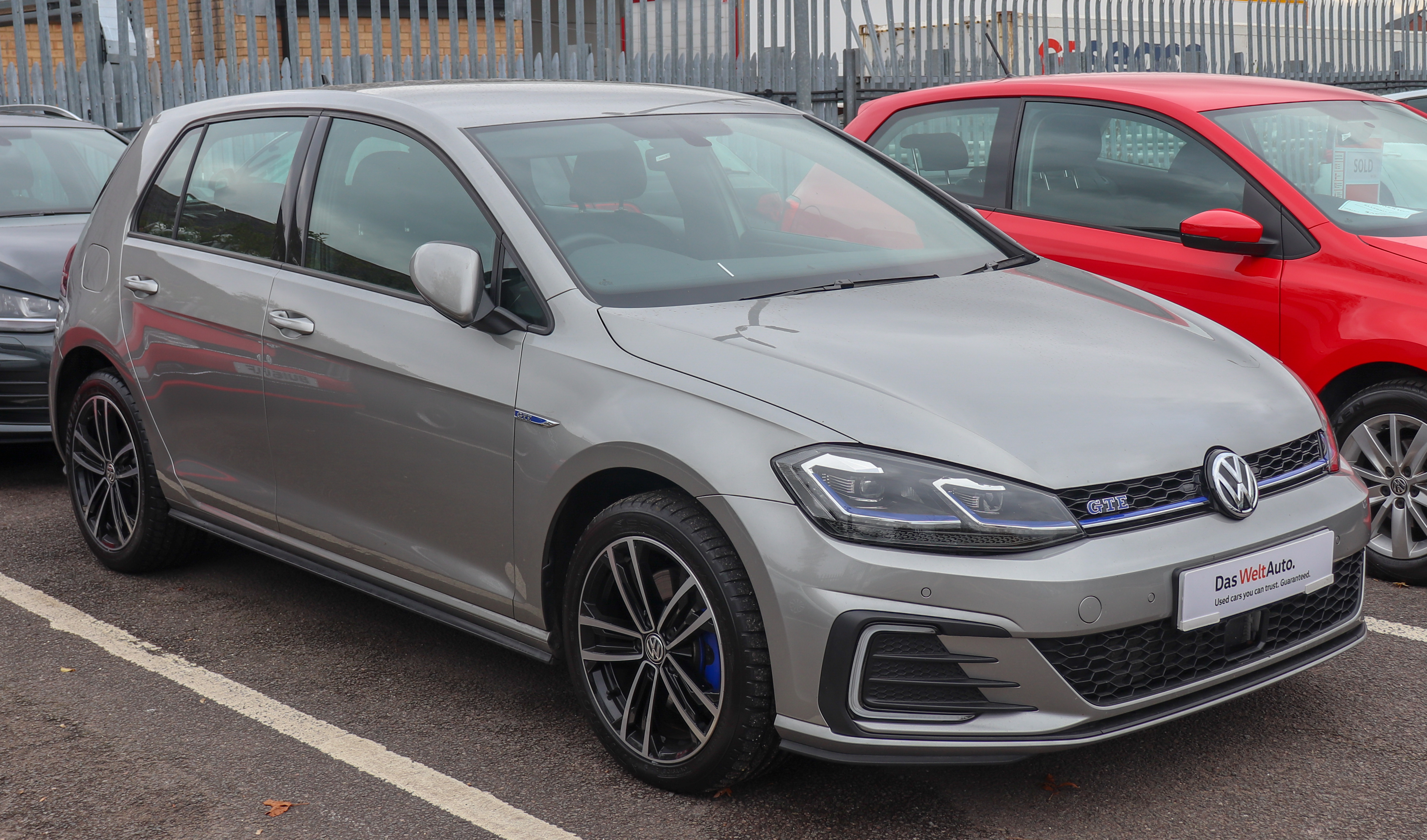
The Volkswagen Golf GTE was released in Europe during the second half of 2014.

As of September 2014, over 247,700 plug-in hybrids had been sold worldwide since 2008. The leading market was the United States, with about 140,000 plug-in hybrids sold, followed by Japan with about 35,600 units, and the Netherlands with 34,362 plug-in hybrids registered. The Volt/Ampera family of vehicles, with global sales of over 83,600 units, ranked as the world's best selling plug-in hybrid and the second best selling plug-in electric car ever, after the Nissan Leaf, which has sold over 140,000 units worldwide. The Prius Plug-in Hybrid ranked second in global plug-in hybrid sales, with 65,300 units sold worldwide through September 2014.

On 1 December 2014, BMW announced the group is planning to offer plug-in hybrid versions of all its core-brand models using eDrive technology developed for its BMW i brand plug-in vehicles. The goal of the company is to use plug-in technology to continue offering high performance vehicles while reducing CO_{2} emissions below 100 g/km. At the time of the announcement the carmaker was already testing a BMW 3 Series plug-in hybrid prototype (328e).

== 2015 ==
The second generation Chevrolet Volt was unveiled at the 2015 North American International Auto Show. The Volt's revised battery system and drivetrain allow, under the United States Environmental Protection Agency (EPA) cycle, an all-electric range of 53 mi (85 km), up from the first generation's 38 mi (61 km). The EPA combined fuel economy in gasoline-only mode was rated at 42 mpg_{‑US} (5.6 L/100 km; 50 mpg_{‑imp}), up from 37 mpg_{‑US} (6.4 L/100 km; 44 mpg_{‑imp}) for the previous generation. The official rating for combined city/highway fuel economy in all-electric mode is 106 miles per gallon gasoline equivalent (MPG-e), up from 98 MPG-e for the 2015 first generation model.

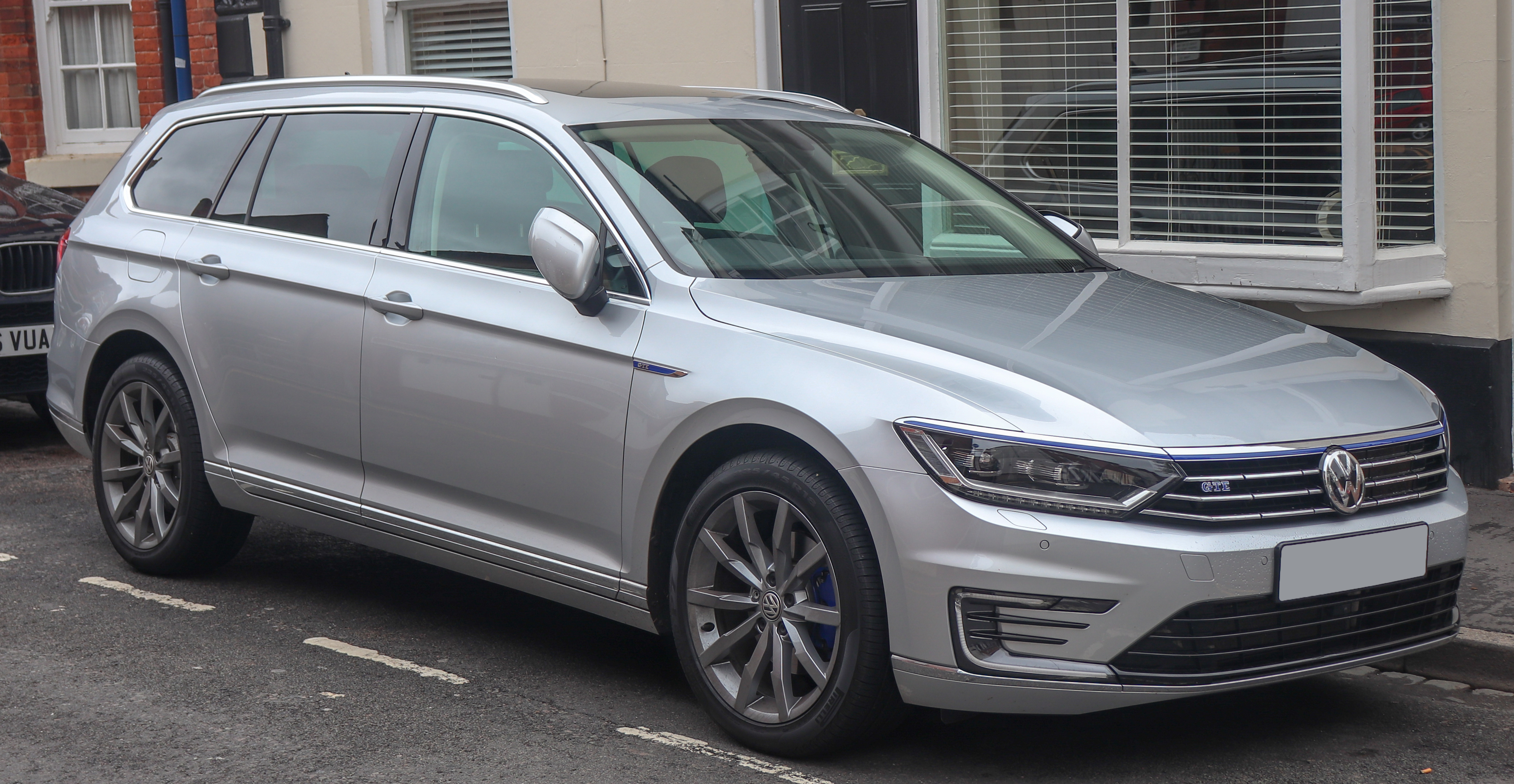
The first Volkswagen Passat GTEs were registered in Germany in January 2015.

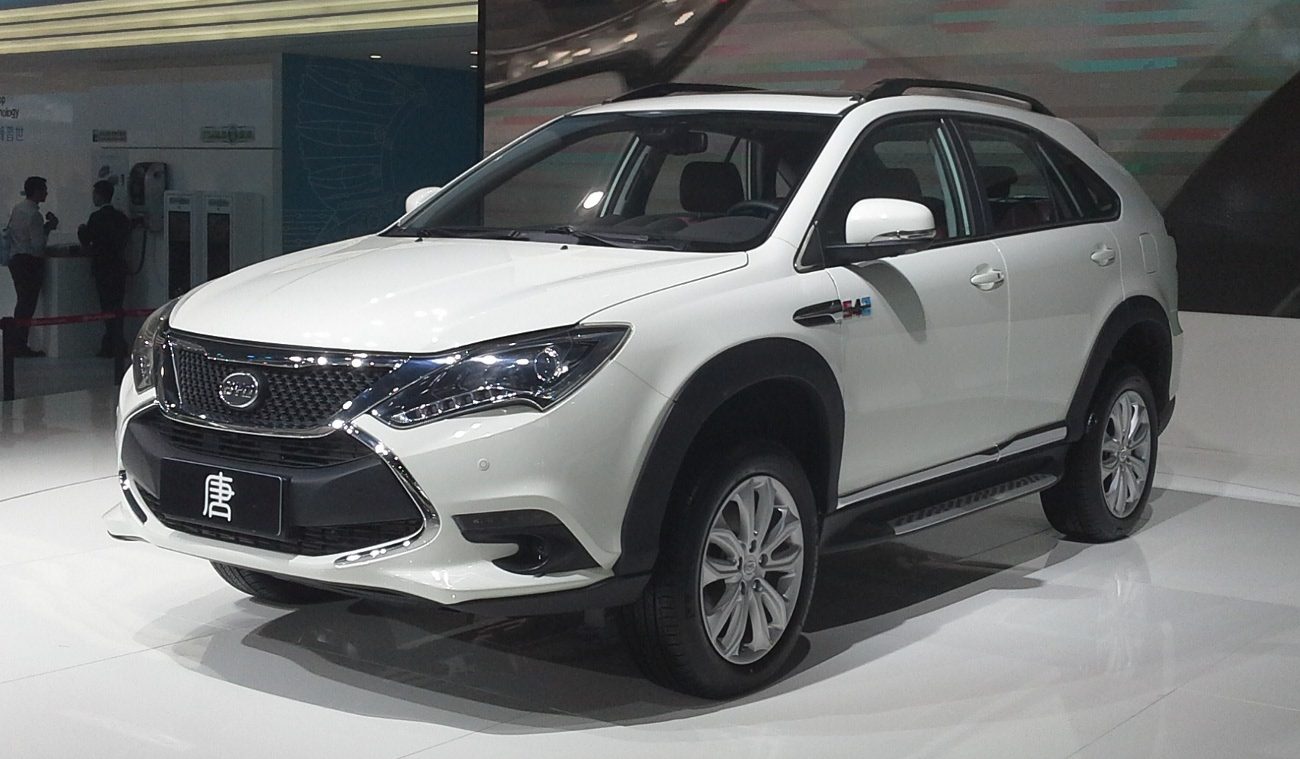
Deliveries of the BYD Tang SUV began in China in June 2015.

In March 2015, Audi announced plans to have a plug-in hybrid version in every model series in the coming years. The carmaker expects plug-in hybrids, together with natural gas vehicles and battery-electric drive systems, to have a key contribution in achieving the company's CO_{2} targets. The Audi Q7 e-tron will follow the A3 e-tron already in the market. Also in March 2015, Mercedes-Benz announced that the company's main emphasis regarding alternative drives in the next years will be on plug-in hybrids. The carmaker plans to introduce 10 new plug-in hybrid models by 2017, and its next release was the Mercedes-Benz C 350e Plug-in Hybrid the carmaker's second plug-in hybrid after the S 500 Plug-In Hybrid. Also in 2015, the GLE 550 e will be the first Mercedes SUV with a plug-in hybrid powertrain.

As of June 2015, the Dutch market had the largest share of plug-in hybrid sales as percentage of total plug-in electric passenger vehicle sales. Accounting for cumulative registrations between 2009 and June 2015, plug-in hybrids (47,227 units) represented 78.8% share of the Dutch stock of registered plug-in electric passenger cars.

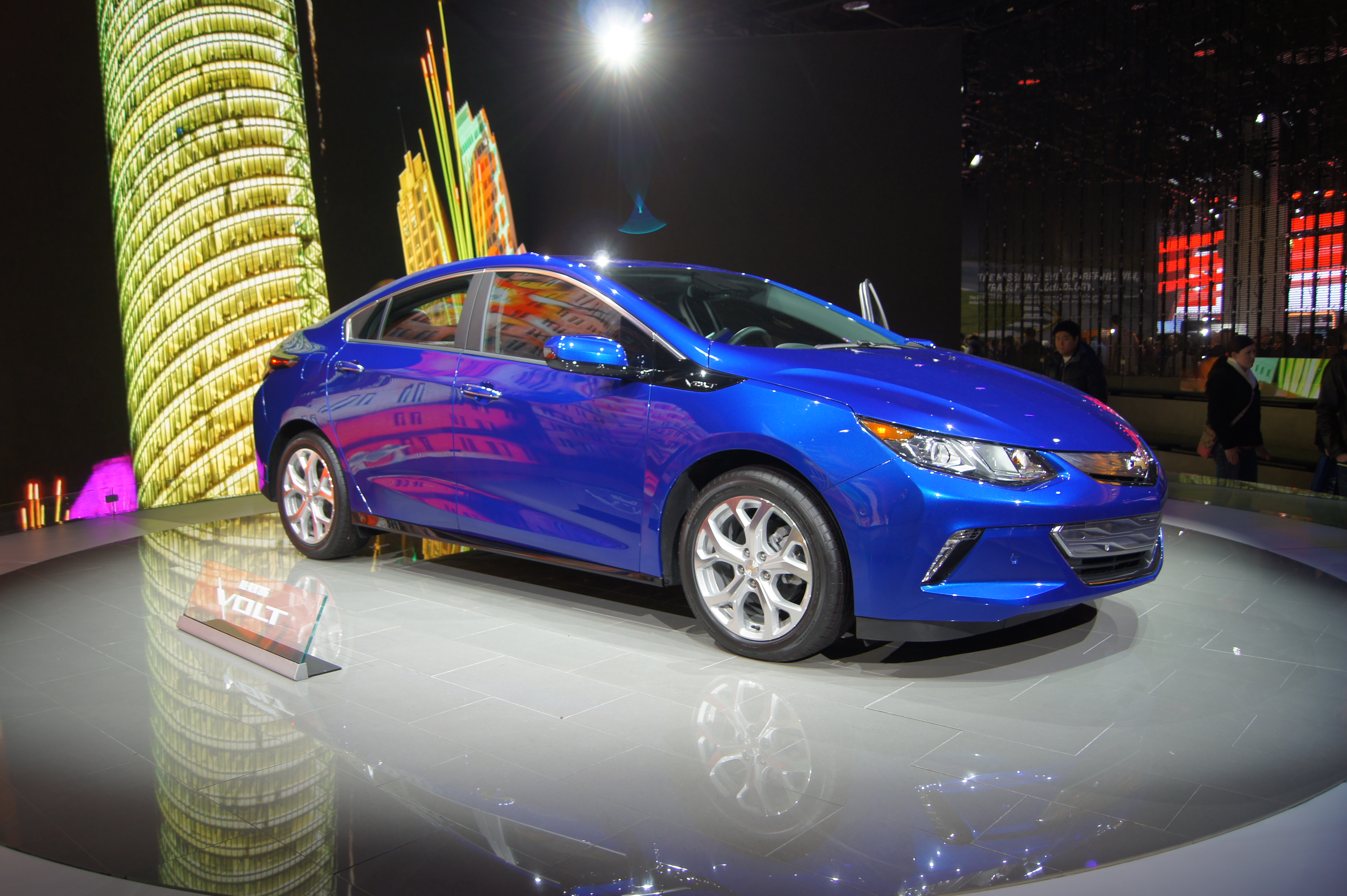
The second generation Chevrolet Volt was released in the United States and Canada in October 2015.

The second generation Chevrolet Volt was released to retail customers in the United States and Canada in October 2015 as a 2016 model year. Availability in the American market was limited to California and the other 10 states that follow California's zero emission vehicle regulations. The second generation Volt went on sale as a 2017 model year in the 39 remaining states by the second quarter of 2016.

Global sales of the Volt/Ampera family passed the 100,000 unit milestone in October 2015. The United States is the leading market with 84,656 Volts delivered, followed by Canada with 5,023 Volts, and the Netherlands, the leading European market, with 4,976 Amperas and 1,065 units registered as of December 2014. As of June 2016, just over 10,000 Opel/Vauxhall Amperas had been sold in Europe plus about 1,750 Volts. As of December 2015, the other top selling plug-in hybrids are the Mitsubishi Outlander P-HEV, with about 92,000 units sold, followed by the first generation Toyota Prius PHEV with about 75,000 units sold globally.

Plug-in models released to the retail customers in 2015 include the Mercedes-Benz C 350e Plug-in Hybrid, Volvo S60L PHEV, Volkswagen Passat GTE, BYD Tang, Audi A3 e-tron, Volvo XC90 T8, BMW X5 xDrive40e, and Hyundai Sonata PHEV.

Almost 222,000 plug-in hybrids were registered worldwide in 2015. As of December 2015, the global stock of highway-capable plug-in hybrid electric cars totaled 517,100 units, out of total cumulative global sales of 1.257 million light-duty plug-in electric vehicles (41.1%). At the end of 2015, the United States is the world's largest plug-in hybrid car market with a stock of 193,770 units, followed by China with 86,580 vehicles, the Netherlands with 78,160, Japan with 55,470 units, and the UK with 28,250.

== 2016 ==
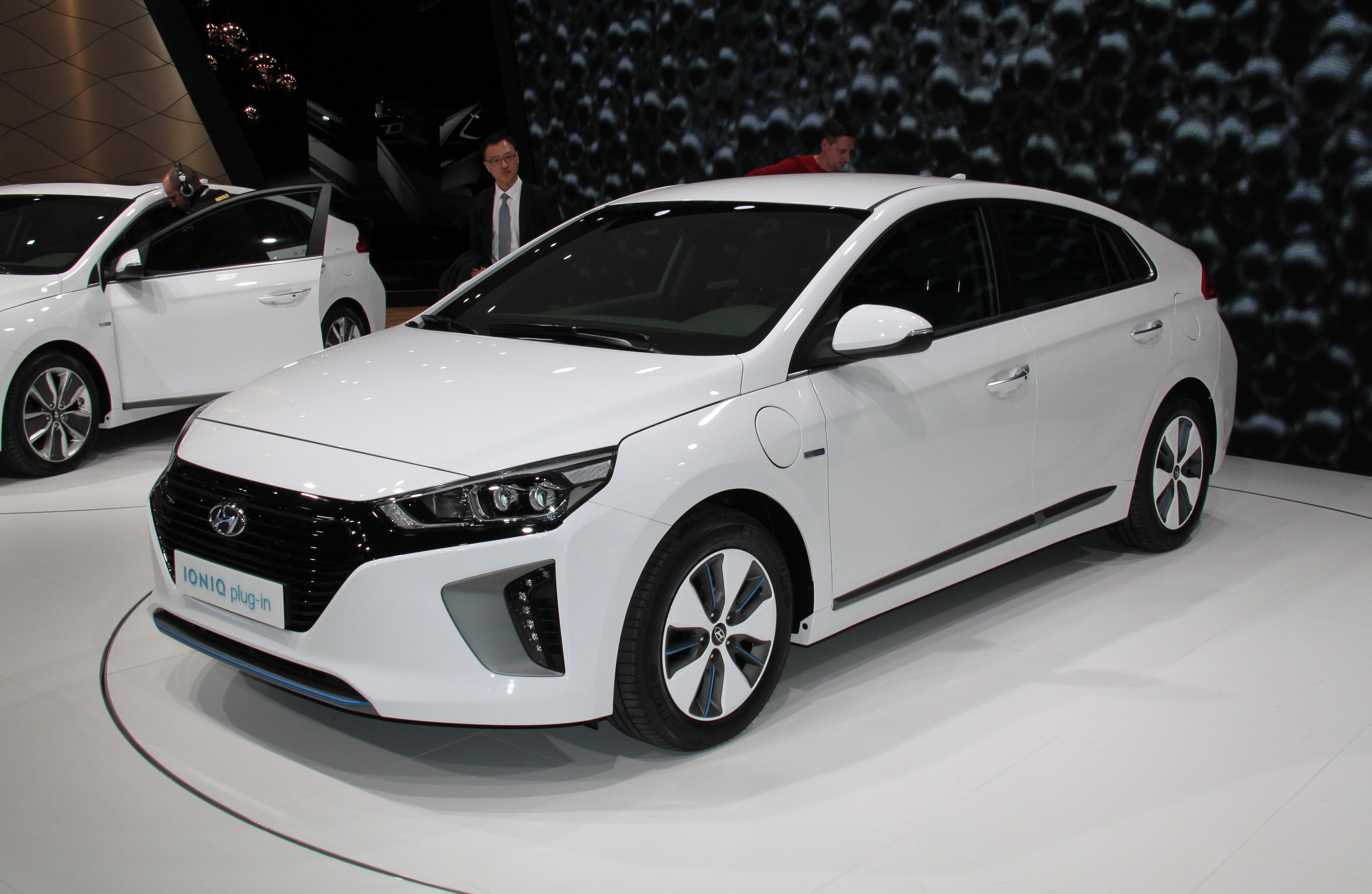
2017 Hyundai Ioniq Plug-in

In February 2016, BMW announced the introduction of the "iPerformance" model designation, which will be given to all BMW plug-in hybrid vehicles from July 2016. The aim is to provide a visible indicator of the transfer of technology from BMW i to the BMW core brand. The new designation will be used first on the plug-in hybrid variants of the new BMW 7 Series, beginning with the BMW 740e iPerformance slated for sales by mid 2016, and the BMW 330e iPerformance.

Hyundai Motor Company made the official debut of its three model Hyundai Ioniq line-up at the 2016 Geneva Motor Show. The Ioniq family of electric drive vehicles includes the Ioniq Plug-in, which is expected to achieve a fuel economy of 125 mpg‑e (27 kW⋅h/100 mi; 16.8 kW⋅h/100 km) in all-electric mode. The Ioniq Plug-in is expected to be released in the U.S. in the fourth quarter of 2016.

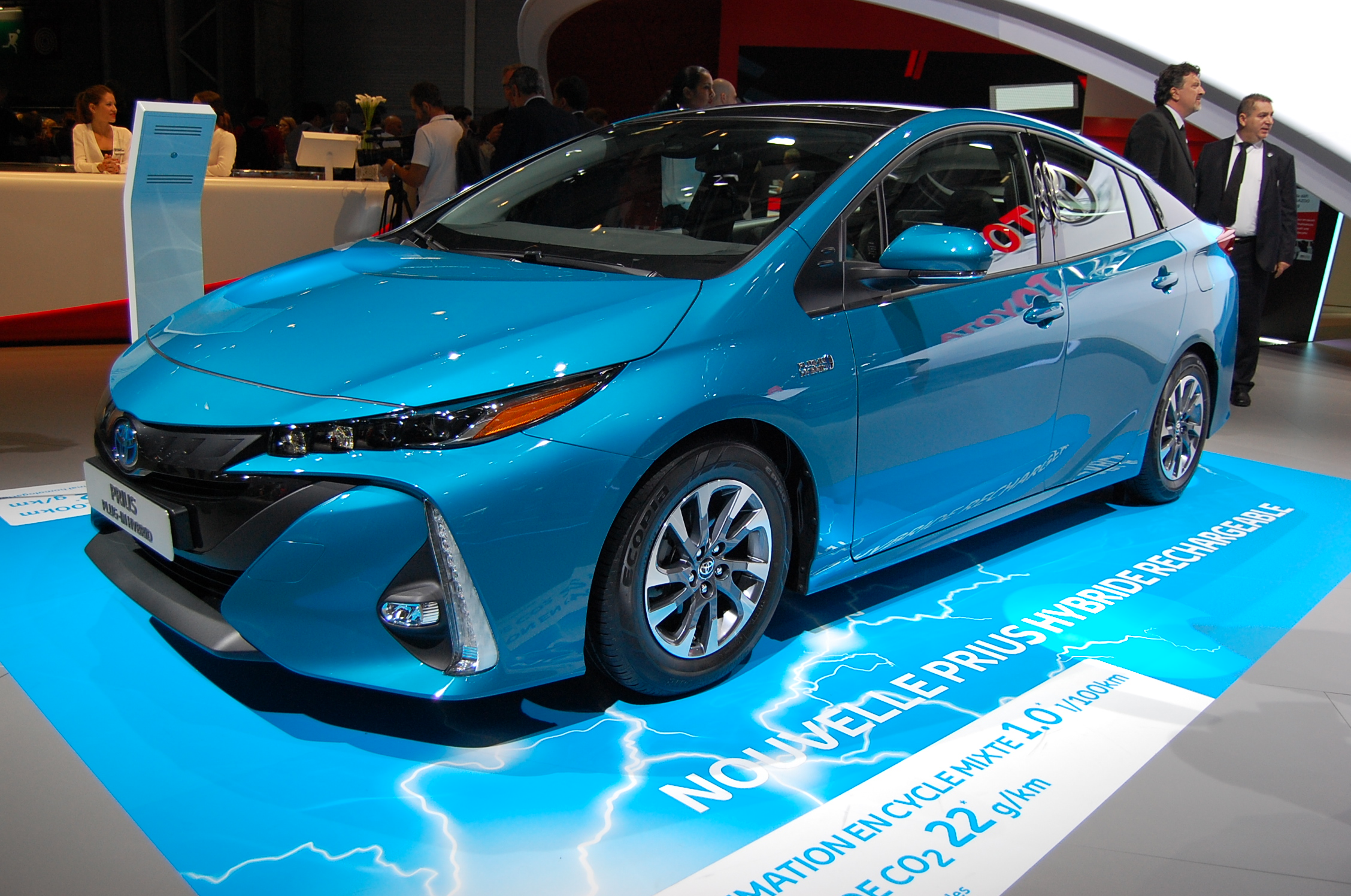
Toyota Prius Prime

The second generation Prius plug-in hybrid, called Prius Prime in the U.S. and Prius PHV in Japan, was unveiled at the 2016 New York International Auto Show. The model is expected to be released in the U.S. and Japan by the end of 2016. The all-electric range is expected to reach 22 mi (35 km), twice the range of the first generation model. Toyota expects the Prime to achieve an EPA rating of 120 mpg‑e (28 kW⋅h/100 mi; 17 kW⋅h/100 km), the highest MPGe rating in all-electric mode of any plug-in hybrid available in the market.

In April 2016, Volvo Cars announced its goal to achieve cumulative sales since 2012 of 1 million electrified cars by 2025. Previously the carmaker had stated it expected electrified models to account for 10% of its global sales by 2020. Volvo CEO Hakan Samuelsson said the company plans to offer at least a plug-in hybrid version of every model and release an all-electric car in 2019. The next electrified car to be released is the plug-in hybrid variant of the Volvo S90 sedan, and the 60 series and 40 series will have electrified versions too.

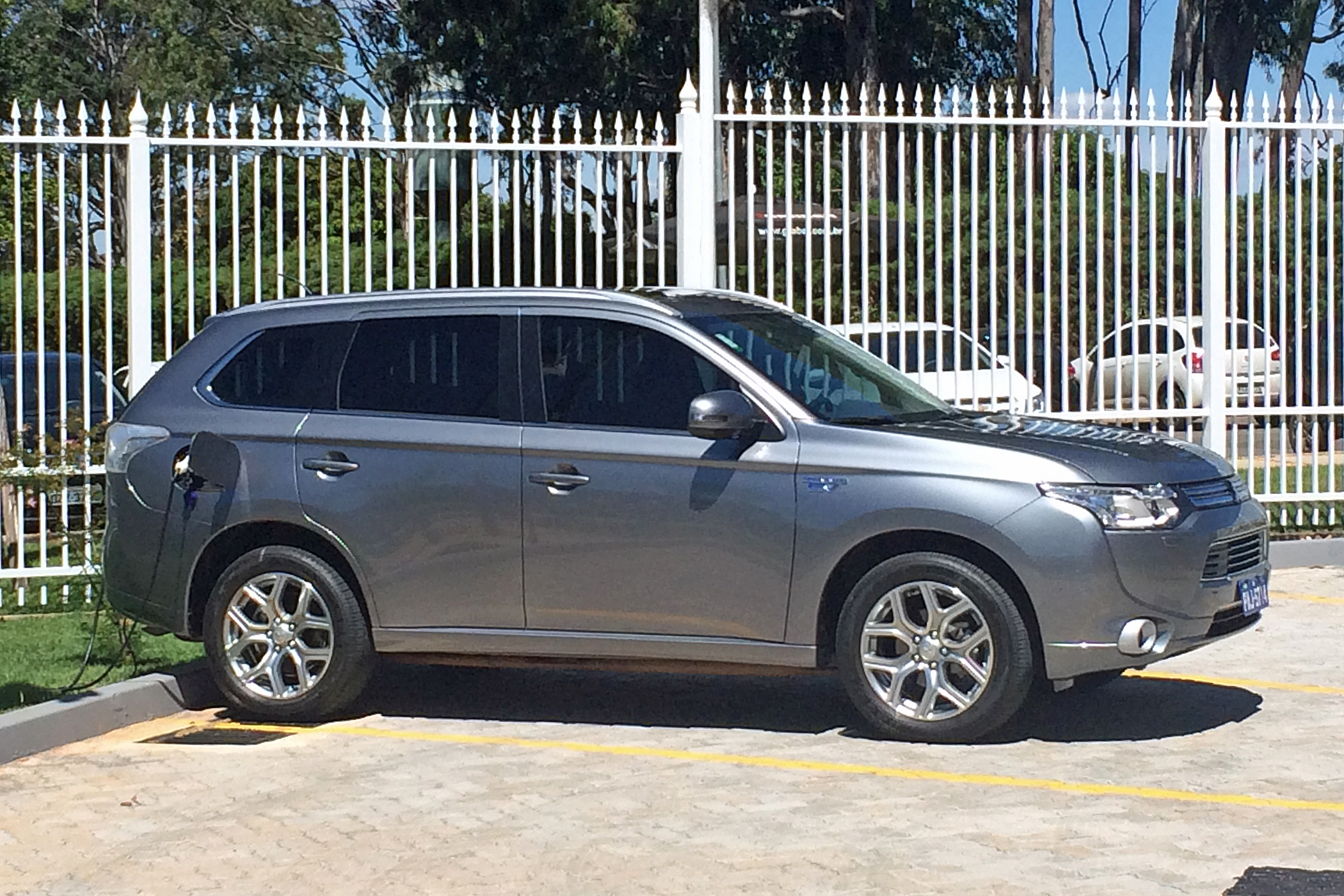
Global sales of the Outlander P-HEV passed the 100,000 milestone in March 2016, and ranks as the world's second best-selling plug-in hybrid ever.

Global sales of the Mitsubishi Outlander plug-in hybrid variant passed the 100,000 unit milestone in March 2016. Europe is the leading market with 65,529 units sold, followed by Japan with 33,730 units. European sales are led by the Netherlands with 24,572 units registered, followed by the UK with 21,053 units registered, both at the end of March 2016. Combined sales of the three top selling countries, Japan, the Netherlands and the UK, represent 78% of total Outlander PHEVs global sales through the end of March 2016. The Outlander P-HEV ranks the world's all-time second best-selling plug-in hybrid after the Chevrolet Volt family, and fourth top selling plug-in electric car ever.

Cumulative global sales of the first generation Prius PHV passed the 75,000 unit mark in March 2016. In June 2016, Nissan announced it will introduce a compact range extender car in Japan before March 2017. The series plug-in hybrid will use a new hybrid system, dubbed e-Power, which debuted with the Nissan Gripz concept crossover showcased at the 2015 Frankfurt Auto Show. Chevrolet Volt sales in the American market passed the 100,000 unit milestone in July 2016, the first plug-in vehicle in the U.S. to achieve that mark.

More than 284,000 light-duty plug-in hybrids were sold during 2016. As of June 2016, about 640,000 highway legal plug-in hybrid electric cars had been sold worldwide since December 2008, out of total global sales of over 1.5 million light-duty plug-in electric cars. Retail deliveries of the second generation Toyota plug-in hybrid, the Prius Prime began in the U.S. in November 2016. A total of 781 units were sold during its first month in the American market, setting a new record monthly sales volume debut for any plug-in electric car released in the U.S.

== 2017 ==
At the Detroit Motor Show in January 2017, Bentley CEO Wolfgang Dürheimer announced that the company intended to introduce plug-in hybrid variants to all its model lines, saying that PHEV technology "combines the best of both worlds".

The Hyundai Ioniq Plug-in was released in February 2017. The Ioniq Plug-in delivers 50 km (31 mi) in all-electric mode.

The Honda Clarity Plug-in Hybrid was introduced in February 2017 receiving a 47-mile (76 km) range in all-electric mode. At the time of going on sale (December 2017) it had the third-longest claimed all-electric range among PHVs available in the US.

2017 also saw the launch of the Kia Optima Plug-in Hybrid. This had an all-electric range of 29 miles (47 km). Compared to the equivalent trim of mild hybrid Optima, the PHV EX variant was 250 pounds (110 kg) heavier with a $4,220 higher list price.

The Cadillac CT6 PHEV went on sale in the US in March 2017, with an all-electric range of 31 miles (50 km).

In June 2017 the Mini Countryman S E ALL4 PHEV was launched, with an all-electric range of 25 miles (40 km). This was seen by some in the motoring press as a potential rival to the highly successful Mitsubishi Outlander PHEV.

Exemplifying the impact that a single model could have on PHEV uptake, Japan saw sales of plug-in hybrids quadruple relative to 2016 following the launch of the second generation Toyota Prius Prime. However, according to the International Energy Agency (IEA) the uptake of electric vehicles continued to be "largely driven by the policy environment" in individual countries. Global sales of PHEVs were 398,000 units over the year.

China, the European Union and India all announced policy changes in 2017 relevant to the adoption of electric cars including PHEVs. China's government announced a new energy vehicle (NEV) credit mandate in September 2017 to set minimum requirements for the number of NEVs (PHEVs, battery electric and fuel cell electric vehicles) that manufacturers would need to produce from June 2018, with the credits earned per NEV depending on its range and energy efficiency. This set a minimum range requirement of 31 miles (50 km) for PHEVs to earn credits.

== 2018 ==
BMW launched the first plug-in hybrid model in its 5 Series range, the 530e. This became its sixth plug-in hybrid model overall. In June 2018, Volvo announced the S60 T8 plug-in hybrid.

In similar market segments, Mercedes introduced diesel plug-in hybrid models of its C- and E-Class just ahead of the Geneva Motor Show in March 2018, to be sold from summer of the same year, with a 90kW motor giving an all-electric range of 31 miles (50 km) and top speeds of 87 mph (140 km/h) in all-electric mode. These models introduced a number of features intended to aid energy efficiency, such as an 'ECO Assist' system using data including the route profile, speed limits and distance from other vehicles to advise the driver when to coast. Mercedes also used a haptic accelerator pedal to provide feedback about the state of the hybrid system, such as when maximum electrical power was reached and further acceleration would engage the internal combustion engine.

At the Geneva Motor Show, Bentley revealed it would introduce a plug-in hybrid version of the Bentley Bentayga from 2019, its first PHEV, with an all-electric range of 31 miles (50 km). Other Volkswagen group PHEV launches in the year included the Porsche Cayenne E-Hybrid and Volkswagen Passat GTE.

Also in March 2018, Land Rover introduced the Range Rover P440E PHEV. With a relatively largely 31.8kWh battery capacity the car offered a relatively long official all-electric range of 70 miles (110 km). Given its large battery capacity, Land Rover made the vehicle compatible with 50kW rapid chargers, an unusual feature for PHEVs at the time.

PHEV models launched by Toyota in 2018 included the Camry XLE Hybrid, and RAV4 Hybrid.

In policy, February 2018 saw China lower the subsidy level for PHEVs through its New Energy Vehicle Subsidy program lowered. Nevertheless, PHEV sales there rose from 111,000 in 2017 to 263,00, as global sales of PHEVs again rose sharply in the year to 630,000.

Sales of PHEVs made up 32% of EV sales in 2018, following a steady decline from 50% in 2012. The uptake of PHEVs relative to battery electric vehicles continued to vary widely between nations, with PHEVs making up as much as 86% of EV sales in Finland but only 14% in the Netherlands. Large cars and SUVs made up 60% of available PHEVs by the end of 2018. Across all major markets (China, the European Union and the US) the number of PHEV models available was similar.

== 2019 ==
General Motors (GM) ended production of all plug-in hybrid models in 2019 including the Chevrolet Volt, saying it would focus on battery electric vehicles such as the Chevrolet Bolt, launched in 2016. Chevrolet had been selling each unit of the Volt at a loss. Said former GM Vice Chairman Bob Lutz "We viewed it as a stepping stone to full electrics, which were totally out of reach due to the then-astronomical cost of lithium-ion batteries."

In the same year, traditional GM rival Ford launched two new plug-in hybrid models, the Kuga and Explorer. The Executive Director of Ford of Europe, Joerg Beyer, explained its choice to offer a range of plug-in and non-plug-in hybrids: "There is no ‘one-size-fits-it-all’ solution when it comes to electrification – every customer’s circumstances and travel needs are different".

Several crossover models had plug-in hybrid versions introduced in 2019 including the Jeep Renegade and Compass, Audi Q5, BMW X3, Range Rover Evoque, and Subaru Crosstrek.

Other models with plug-in hybrid variants launched in 2019 included the Audi A6, A7, and A8 and BMW 7 Series.

After growing consecutively in every year from 2005, global PHEV sales fell by 10% from 2018. This reflected a slowdown in new car sales overall, but also a decreasing share of PHEVs as a proportion of total electric vehicle sales in all major markets (by contrast, battery electric vehicle sales rose by 14% on the previous year).

== 2020s ==
Global annual PHEV sales passed the 1 million mark for the first time in the early 2020s, almost doubling from 970,000 sales in 2020 to 1.9 million in 2021. In 2022 PHEV sales in China (1.5 million) exceeded those in Europe (1.0 million) for the first time; over the following years Chinese sales figures would continue to outgrow those in Europe rapidly, being around fives times higher by 2024. In the US, the growth in market share of PHEVs stalled compared to conventional hybrids and pure EVs, being around 2% of all sales in the year to September 2024.

Over the 5 years to 2023, plug-in hybrid sales globally grew by 63% per year, ahead of battery-electric (57%) and hybrid (18%) sales. This period saw an increase in the average all-electric range of new PHEVs from around 50km to 80km, largely driven by the adoption of new, longer-range models in China. A contributing factor was the continued growth of Extended Range EVs (EREVs), which made up one-third of Chinese PHEV sales in 2023 and had an average range of 127km. The average price of new PHEVs in China fell below the price of internal combustion engine cars for the first time in 2023.

The early 2020s also saw an increasing inclusion of fast charging compatibility in new PHEVs, which had been absent from many earlier models.

In 2024, Extended Range EVs (EREVs) were the fastest-growing drivetrain among electric vehicle types, with a year-on-year sales increase of 83% to 1.2 million. With this expansion, by mid-2024 PHEV sales in China had reached roughly the same rate as battery electric vehicle sales. This period saw previously battery electric vehicle only manufacturers such as Avatr and Zeekr announce they would enter the EREV market.

With limited model availability outside China, the growth in EREVs to 2024 was largely driven by the Chinese market. Surveys by McKinsey in 2024 in Germany, the UK and the US on car owners' purchase intentions for the powertrain of their next vehicle found that availability of EREVs reduced the intention to buy ICE cars by the largest amount. In October 2024, Scout Motors, a Volkswagen Group subsidiary, announced two EREV models for release in North America in 2027. Other major manufacturers outside China including Nissan, Hyundai, Mazda and Buick began to announce planned EREV models from late 2023 onwards.

The first pickup truck to be given an EREV power train commercially, announced in 2024, was the Changan Hunter.

Continuing the trend of increasing ranges for PHEVs, China announced in 2025 that from 1 January 2026 PHEVs would need to have a minimum all-electric range of 100km to be eligible for NEV purchase tax relief, which compared to a previous minimum range of 43km. Many mainstream PHEV models in the country had already exceeded this benchmark at the time of the policy announcement. At the top end of battery capacities, by 2025 some PHEV models on sale had battery packs exceeding 60kWh, while manufacturers including Leapmotor, GWM and Xiaomi were reported to be planning models with battery capacities of 80kWh or more, comparable to contemporary pure electric vehicles such as the Tesla Model Y L (82kWh) and Onvo L90 (85kWh). The Ram 1500 Ramcharger, originally scheduled for production from 2024 but later delayed to 2027, claims a battery capacity of 92kWh and all-electric range of 233km.

From 2016 to 2021 electric vehicle sales roughly doubled each year in Latin America. With limited public charging networks, PHEVs were particularly popular in the region, accounting for two thirds of electric vehicle sales in 2021 against a global average of just 30%. In 2025, PHEV sales in Latin America surpassed 100,000 for the first time, more than doubling from the previous year. To take advantage of the Brazilian car market's significant integration of biofuels, BYD launched a flex-fuel engine for the Song Pro, which would run on any combination of gasoline and ethanol. According to BYD's founder and CEO Wang Chuanfu, this was the first plug-in hybrid dedicated to biofuel.

The 2020s also marked an increased presence of plug-in hybrid models in the sports car market. The BMW M5 G90 (2025) became the first of BMW's high-performance M saloon range with a PHEV powertrain. Other sports car models launched include the Mercedes-AMG One (2022), Ferrari's SF90 Stradale (2020), and Ferrari 296 (2022). These models typically used the hybrid element mainly to increase power and responsiveness and launched with modest all-electric ranges, from 10km for the Lamborghini Revuelto (2024) to 30.6km for the McLaren Artura (2022), although these were surpassed in 2026 by the 50km range of the Koenigsegg Gemera.

== Top selling models ==
The following table presents cumulative sales of those plug-in hybrid models that have sold about 10,000 units since the introduction of the first modern production plug-in hybrid vehicle in December 2008, the BYD F3DM, up until December 2016.

Top selling highway legal plug-in hybrid electric cars between 2008 and December 2016
Model	Market launch	Global sales	Sales through
Chevrolet Volt^{(1)}	Dec 2010	~134,500	Dec 2016
Mitsubishi Outlander P-HEV	Jan 2013	~119,500	Dec 2016
Toyota Prius PHV	Jan 2012	~77,850	Dec 2016
BYD Qin^{(2)}	Dec 2013	68,655	Dec 2016
BYD Tang^{(2)}	Jun 2015	49,780	Dec 2016
Ford Fusion Energi^{(3)}	Feb 2013	43,713	Dec 2016
Ford C-Max Energi^{(4)}	Oct 2012	35,705	Dec 2016
SAIC Roewe 550 PHEV^{(2)}	Nov 2013	26,856	Dec 2016
Volkswagen Golf GTE	Aug 2014	24,089	Jun 2016
Volvo V60 Plug-in Hybrid	Nov 2012	21,185	Jun 2016
Audi A3 Sportback e-tron^{(5)}	Aug 2014	18,467	Jun 2016
BMW i8	Aug 2014	10,000	Nov 2016
Volvo XC90 T8^{(5)}	Aug 2015	9,044	Jun 2016
Cumulative global sales Dec 2008 – Dec 2016		~800,000	Dec 2016
Notes: (1) Includes Vauxhall/Opel Ampera sales in Europe, and Holden Volt in Australia and New Zealand. This figure includes over 10,000 Opel/Vauxhall Amperas sold in Europe through December 2016. (2) Sales in China only. (3) Sales in the U.S. and Canada only. (4) Only includes European sales for 2015. (5) Only accounts for CYTD 2016 sales in Europe, U.S. and Canada.

== Notable production models ==
Model	Image	Range(EV mode)	Comments
BYD F3DM		97 km (60 mi)	The world's first mass-produced plug-in hybrid automobile. The F3DM was launched in December 2008 for the Chinese market for fleet customers and in March 2010 to the general public in Shenzhen.
Fisker Karma		51 km (32 mi)	The first deliveries in the United States took place in late July 2011, but deliveries to retail customers began in November 2011. Production was suspended in November 2012 due to financial difficulties. Fisker Automotive filed for bankruptcy in November 2013.
Porsche 918 Spyder		19 km (12 mi)	Porsche limited production to 918 units, sold as a 2014 model year. The supercar is capable of reaching 100 mph (160 km/h) in all-electric mode. Retail deliveries began in Europe in May 2014. Deliveries in the United States began in June 2014.
McLaren P1		31 km (19 mi)	Deliveries to retail customers started in the UK in October 2013. Production is limited to 375 units to maintain exclusivity. The entire production was sold out by mid November 2013. The production run ended in December 2015.
Chevrolet Volt		1st generation 56 km (35 mi) 2nd generation 85 km (53 mi)	Volt deliveries in the U.S. began in December 2010 and in September 2011 in Canada. European customer deliveries of the Opel Ampera began in February 2012.As of November 2016, the Volt/Ampera family ranked as the world's best-selling plug-in car in history, with global sales of more than 130,500 units.
BMW i8		37 km (23 mi)(NEDC)24 km (15 mi) (EPA)	Retail deliveries began in Germany in June 2014, and in the U.S. started in August 2014. Deliveries of the roadster variant began in May 2018. Global sales to retail customers totaled more than 20,000 units by March 2020, and production ended in April 2020.

== See also ==
- Electric car use by country
- History of the electric vehicle
- History of the hybrid electric vehicle
- List of hybrid vehicles
- List of modern production plug-in electric vehicles
- Plug-in electric vehicle

Country/region specific

- New energy vehicles in China
- Plug-in electric vehicles in Japan
- Plug-in electric vehicles in the Netherlands
- Plug-in electric vehicles in Norway
- Plug-in electric vehicles in the United Kingdom
- Plug-in electric vehicles in the United States
- Plug-in hybrids in California
- Plug-in hybrids in New York
