= Low rolling resistance tire =

Tires that improve vehicle fuel efficiency compared with conventional tires

Low rolling resistance tires are designed to reduce the energy loss as a tire rolls, decreasing the required rolling effort — and in the case of automotive applications, improving vehicle fuel efficiency as approximately 5–15% of the fuel consumed by a typical gas car may be used to overcome rolling resistance.

Such tires are now commonly installed as standard, either mandated by law or to meet eco labelling standards.

== Measuring rolling resistance in tires ==
Rolling resistance can be expressed by the rolling resistance coefficient (RRC or C_{rr}), which is the value of the rolling resistance force divided by the wheel load. A lower coefficient means the tires will use less energy to travel a certain distance. The coefficient is mostly considered as independent of speed, but for precise calculations it is tabled at several speeds or an additional speed-dependent part is used. The Society of Automotive Engineers (SAE) has developed test practices to measure the RRC of tires. These tests (SAE J1269 and SAE J2452) are usually performed on new tires.

When measured by using these standard test practices, most new passenger tires have reported RRCs ranging from 0.007 to 0.014. In the case of bicycle tires, values of 0.0025 to 0.005 are achieved. These coefficients are measured on rollers, with power meters on road surfaces, or with coast-down tests. In the latter two cases, the effect of air resistance must be subtracted or the tests performed at very low speeds. In 2009 The CEC used a rating called Rolling Resistance Force RRF. RRF and RRC, rolling resistance coefficient are very similar. Difference is taking the RRF and dividing it by the load(weight) to get RRC. So a Michelin Harmony tire rated at 9.45 RRF at 1000 pounds load would be .0095 RRC.

In the early 2010s in Canada, Transport Canada tests were planned on a number of different tires mounted on 15 and 16-inch rims – the most common tire sizes in Canada at that time – to determine how rolling resistance is influenced by vehicle size, tire width and profile. Results will be used to inform Canadians about the types of low rolling resistance tires available in Canada, and whether they can help reduce fuel consumption and pollutants from passenger vehicles. SAE J2452 is a standard defined by the Society of Automotive Engineers to define the rolling resistance of tires.

The rolling resistance coefficient (RRC) indicates the amount of force required to overcome the hysteresis of the material as the tire rolls. Tire pressure, vehicle weight and velocity all play a role in how much force is lost to rolling resistance.

The basic model equation for SAE J2452 is:

Rolling Resistance (N / lbs) $= P^\alpha Z^\beta (a + bv + cv^2)$

where:

$P$ is the tire inflation pressure (kPa / psi)
$Z$ is the applied load for the vehicle weight (N / lbs)
$v$ is the vehicle speed (km/h / mph)
$\alpha$, $\beta$, $a$, $b$, and $c$ are the coefficients of the model

$\alpha$ and $\beta$ are dimensionless. The units of $a$, $b$, and $c$ are determined by both the unit system and the values of $\alpha$ and $\beta$, so that the equation is consistent.

This model is newer than SAE J1269 and provides more accuracy over a range of different vehicle loads (weight), tire pressures and vehicle speeds.

The 2018 version of ISO 28580 section 3.2 defines the unit for rolling resistance coefficient (C_{r}) as N/kN (newton/kilonewton) yielding values that are small integers (e.g., 7 rather than 0.007).

== Fuel consumption ==
A 2003 California Energy Commission (CEC) preliminary study estimated that adoption of low-rolling resistance tires could save 1.5–4.5% of all gasoline consumption, but that current data were also insufficient to compare safety and other characteristics.

A United States National Highway Traffic Safety Administration (NHTSA) study in 2009 found that if 2% of the replacement tires would reduce their rolling resistance by 5%, there would be 7.9 million gallons fuel and 76,000 metric tons of CO_{2} saved annually.

(SAE J1269 and SAE J2452) performed on new tires.

== Standard equipment ==
Because fuel efficiency is an important selling point for most hybrid vehicles, they are often equipped with low-rolling resistance tires. Electric vehicles are also often equipped with low-rolling resistance tires to maximize their range.

Auto manufacturers in the United States typically equip new vehicles with tires that have lower rolling resistance than their average after-market replacements, in order to meet Corporate Average Fuel Economy (CAFE) standards.

These include Conti Contact, Michelin Energy, Bridgestone Ecopia, and Goodyear Eagle LS tires. For Indian roads, Madras Rubber Factory(MRF) offers the MRF ZSLK range of eco-friendly car tires with low rolling resistance.

== Available tires ==
Some tires available in 2003 ranked by coefficient from lowest (least wasteful), according to the United States National Academy of Sciences Transportation Research Board Special Report 286 and the March 2003 Green Seal report on the topic.

- 0.00615 Bridgestone B381 P145/80R14
- 0.00650 Michelin SYMMETRY P225/60R16
- 0.00683 Uniroyal TIGER PAW AWP P225/60R16
- 0.00700 Bridgestone DUELER H/T 113S P265/70R17
- 0.00709 BFGoodrich RUGGED TRAIL T/A P285/70R17
- 0.00754 Michelin LTX A/S P255/65R17
- 0.00758 Goodyear INTEGRITY (OE) P225/60R16
- 0.00760 Bridgestone INSIGNIA SE 200 89S P195/65R15
- 0.00767 BFGoodrich RUGGED TRAIL T/A P245/65R17
- 0.00780 Continental Ameri-G4S WS P235/75R15
- 0.00783 Continental CrossContact LX
- 0.00795 Uniroyal TPAW TOURING TR/SR P215/70R16
- 0.00810 Bridgestone DUELER H/T 104S P235/70R16
- 0.00813 Goodyear Invicta GL 235/75R15
- 0.00825 Continental ContiTouring Contact CH95 P205/55R16
- 0.00829 Michelin CROSS TERRAIN SUV P255/75R17
- 0.00833 Michelin PILOT PRIMACY 275/50R19
- 0.00850 Michelin ENERGY LX4 P225/60R16
- 0.00854 Michelin PILOT LTX P265/70R17
- 0.00855 Michelin ENERGY MXV4 PLUS 235/65R17

Here is a list of Consumer Report's tires that achieved their best rolling resistance rating. The tires at the top of the list are rated higher overall.

- Highly rated:
  - All Season
    - Michelin X Radial
    - Michelin Agility Touring
    - Michelin Harmony
    - Toyo 800 Ultra
    - Sumitomo HTR T4
- Middle rank
  - Performance All Season
    - Michelin Energy MXV4 Plus
    - Continental ContiPremierContact H
- Least benefit
  - All Season Ultra High Performance
    - General Exclaim UHP
    - Continental ContiExtremeContact

Below are the light duty tires (as reported by Consumer reports) achieving their best rolling resistance rating. Again, higher overall rated tires are closer to the top of the list.

- All-season
  - Bridgestone Dueler H/T D684
  - Michelin Cross Terrain
  - Continental ContiTrac SUV
  - BFGoodrich Radial Long Trail T/A

Followed by:

- All-terrain
  - Continental ContiTrac TR

New models by 2009:

- Michelin Energy Saver
- Goodyear Assurance Fuel Max

== Comparison with conventional tires ==
Depending on the specific technique and materials used by the manufacturers, tire life may be as good as conventional tires, and traction may also be as good.

A Transport Canada study that examined performance of vehicles that combined "light weighting" (reducing vehicle weight) and Low Rolling Resistance tires found that such vehicles performed about the same or better than their non-light-weighted/regular tire counterparts. The test vehicles were a Ford F150, rear-wheel drive standard pick-up truck; an Acura MDX, all-wheel drive sport-utility vehicle; and a Volkswagen Jetta, front-wheel drive compact sedan. Top speed and acceleration generally improved. "Handling performance showed no significant correlation with light-weighted and LRR tires; Braking & slalom testing showed variable results for the setups tested."

A Union of Concerned Scientists newsletter says "LRR tires also meet the same federal standards for treadwear, traction, and temperature resistance as regular tires."

Older Low-rolling resistance tires may reduce ability to grip, especially when taking corners, and may also wear out more rapidly.

== Regional requirements ==
California has rolling resistance requirements that went into effect in July 2008. The law was passed in 2003 and the standards and reporting requirements were finalized in 2007. More stringent requirements for replacement tires were approved in 2026, generally requiring C_{r} of 9 or lower starting in 2029 and 7 or lower starting in 2033.

United Nations require a regulation too: "Tire Rolling Sound Emissions, Adhesion on Wet Surfaces, and Rolling Resistance | UN Regulation No. 117".

== Certifications ==
Passenger tires are tested for rolling resistance in order to obtain the German Blue Angel eco-label

== See also ==
- Rolling resistance
- Fuel efficiency
- Blue Angel (certification)
