= Andrew A. Frank =

American academic

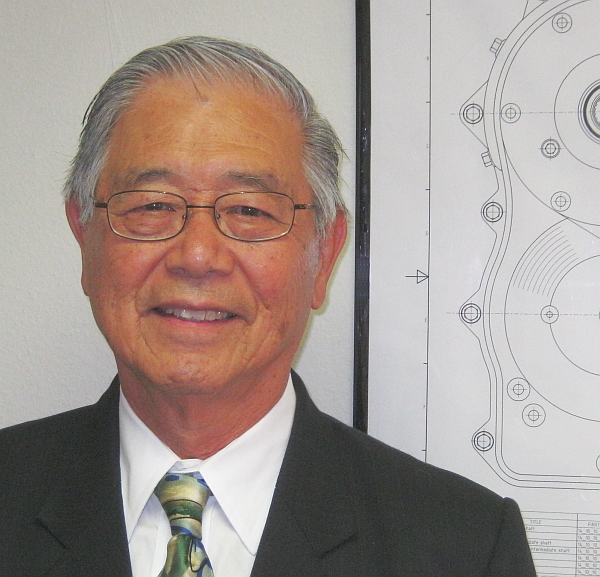
Andrew A. Frank, 2012.

Andrew Alfonso Frank is an emeritus American professor of Mechanical and Aeronautical Engineering at University of California, Davis (UC Davis). He is recognized as the father of modern plug-in hybrids, and coined the term Plug-in Hybrid Electric Vehicle (PHEV).

== Education ==
Frank has a B.S.M.E degree (1955) from the University of California, Berkeley, a M.S.M.E (1958), from the University of California, Berkeley, a M.S.E.E (1965) from the University of Southern California, and holds a Ph.D. in E.E (1968) from the University of Southern California.

== Career ==
Frank worked at North American Aviation then North American/Rockwell Aviation from 1955 to 1968 on programs such as the X15 Research Aircraft, Helicopter stability and control systems, the Apollo Project to the moon, and the Minuteman intercontinental ballistic missile programs.

Frank and his students in Team FATE have been experimenting with various advanced vehicle technologies since 1971. He constructed his first Hybrid Electric Vehicle at the Electrical Engine Dept. of the University of Wisconsin–Madison with his students in 1971 with the only hybrid electric entry into the URBAN CAR Competition of 1972. He then secured a US DOT contract to design and construct with Ford Motor Company help, the first Flywheel drive cars with a mechanical Continuously Variable Transmission (CVT) for better fuel economy and higher performance.

Research into flywheel drive was continued to 1985 when Frank transferred to the Mechanical Engineering department of the University of California-Davis. He began by entering the SAE Super Mileage Contest run by the US-AAA and SAE with his students and began to create a new concept of teaching mechanical engineering. In 1991, he and his teams of students set world records of 3313 mpg on gasoline and 2200 mpg on M85 in two separate cars. Since second place was so far below, it was attributed to error for many years. The Gasoline record was finally broken by 50 mpg 10 years later and the world record M85 still stands today.

In 1992, the USDOE created an Advanced Vehicle Technology Competition called HEV Challenge to compete with the Partnership for a New Generation of Vehicles (US-PNGV) program to design modern cars that could triple fuel economy to 80 mpg. In 1992 and 1993 he and his students demonstrated a Plug in hybrid vehicle that achieved 72 mpg nearly achieving the 80 mpg target by the PNGV program. In 1996 his team of students converted a Ford Taurus to a PHEV in the USDOE AVTC Future Car Challenge to fifteen Universities across the US and Canada. The University of California, Davis vehicle achieved 68 mpg as demonstrated on a trip from Detroit to Washington DC. He and his team then created PHEV automatic transmission models with more efficient mechanical Continuously Variable Transmissions CVTs' and also full size PHEV SUV's that could double fuel economy. The last AVTC project was in 2005 with the Challenge X: Crossover to Sustainable Mobility, in which UC-Davis converted a Chevrolet Equinox to a 4-wheel drive system with double the fuel economy and equal or better performance with no loss if interior space and 40 miles of All Electric Range in a PHEV configuration. In the late nineties General Motors contracted Frank to convert an EV 1 electric car to plug-in hybrid.

In 2006 Romm and Frank described the gasoline-electric hybrid vehicles that were starting to be manufactured. These hybrid vehicles achieved greater fuel economy than traditional vehicles powered only with a gasoline engine. They also mentioned that the next generation of plug-in hybrid vehicles would soon enable the vehicle's battery to be recharged from an electrical source. This would allow the vehicle fleet to be powered from a wider range of fuel sources.

In 2007, Frank described historical development of the plug-in hybrid vehicles (PHEVs) that were starting to appear in the marketplace. Frank's choice for the best PHEV design is a "parallel hybrid configuration" comprising an electric motor, internal combustion engine, continuously variable transmission and a high capacity battery. Additional benefits of PHEVs include load leveling of our electrical grid (vehicle-to-grid) and our electrical use at home (vehicle-to-house).

Frank's projects for US DOE and US DOT while directing students have created vehicles that have set world records in fuel economy with the Society of Automotive Engineers (SAE). He has been a member of SAE since 1965. Frank has been a consultant for the automotive industry and has had issued many patents that have been assigned to his consultancies. Frank is a member of the CalCars initiative.

Frank's pioneering invention portfolio in plug-in hybrid vehicle technology and transmission systems developed at UC Davis have been licensed to Efficient Drivetrains Inc (EDI) of Palo Alto in Silicon Valley. Frank is currently CTO of Efficient Drivetrains Inc (EDI).
