= DNV Fuel Fighter =

The DNV Fuel Fighter is a battery electric car that was designed and built in Norway as a student project at the Norwegian University of Science and Technology (NTNU). It was built to compete in the Shell Eco Marathon. The purpose of the competition is to design a vehicle that can drive as far as possible on the least amount of fuel.

== History ==
The original DNV Fuel Fighter was designed by a group of ten students from NTNU, as a Masters thesis and project in 2009. The car was named after their main sponsor DNV (Det Norske Veritas).

The original DNV Fuel Fighter was a modification of its predecessor PureChoice, Wanting to repeat last year's success, the people behind the original DNV Fuel Fighter were determined to enter the competition again and win. They also wanted to be the first car to drive more than 1,000 km (620 mi) on the energy equivalent of one liter of gasoline.

When the original DNV Fuel Fighter competed in the 2009 Shell Eco Marathon the cars were to compete in a total of three races. Due to technical problems, the original DNV Fuel Fighter team was unable to finish the first two races. However, on their third run the original DNV Fuel Fighter ended up winning the Urban Concept-car class and setting a new world-record after driving the equivalent of 1,246 km (774 mi) on one liter of gasoline. The distance of 1246 km was calculated by first measuring how much hydrogen they had used to drive the distance of the track, and then converting that amount into energy. Knowing how much energy there is in one liter of gasoline (about 32.0 MJ/L), the amount of gasoline per kilometer can be calculated.

The previous world record was 848 km and was set in 2008, by De Haagse Hogeschool from Netherlands.

The original DNV Fuel Fighter also won the prize for the lowest CO_{2} emissions in the Urban Concept category, with an emission of 2.6g/km.

Preparing for the Shell Eco Marathon 2010 the DNV Fuel Fighter team wanted to take the car even further. This year the hard work did not pay off and the car never managed to finish any attempt.

After the failed attempts of the 2010 team the DNV Fuel Fighter 2011 team focused heavily on systems engineering and reliability and managed a second place in the Urban Concept Fuel Cell class. This year the car managed an equivalent of 957 km (595 mi) on one liter of gasoline.

With a chassis that had been through four competitions and hundreds of small modifications the 2012 team quickly realized that the reliability of the system was too low. The battery electric car technology at this point had become a lot more promising and the prestige of the Shell Eco-marathon Urban Concept Fuel Cell class was going down as it in 2011 for the first time had fewer competitors than the battery electric class. Therefore, the new car, called DNV Fuel Fighter 2, was made a battery electric car. This was proved an extremely good solution when only four teams registered for the fuel cell class against 15 in battery electric class. On May 4, 2012, the new car was presented. The DNV Fuel Fighter managed a fifth place in the Urban Concept Battery Electric class with an equivalent of 1,580 km (980 mi) on one liter of gasoline.

The new car was a great success, but it did not do the job of putting NTNU on the podium. This had many reasons, first and for most though competition, in addition to some technological difficulties.

The 2013 team built upon the DNV Fuel Fighter 2 under the old name: DNV Fuel Fighter. The car reached the podium and the team won both the Communication Award and the Design Award.

For the 2014 competition the DNV GL Fuel Fighter 2 was used again together with a new electric prototype car. The DNV GL Fuel Fighter 2 reached 3rd place again the UrbanConcept Electric class while the prototype car reached 7th place.

Before the 2015 competition a new car was made to compete in the UrbanConcept Hydrogen class named DNV GL Future, but did not manage to complete a valid run. The prototype car reached 11th place, this year under the name DNV GL Future.

For the 2016 competitions only the DNV G Fuel Fighter 3 was signed up for the competition, but no valid attempts were achieved.

A new car, the DNV GL Fuel Fighter 4 was designed for the UrbanConcept Battery-electric class for the 2017 competition. The car was built in just five months, but did not finish a valid run.

At the 2018 Shell Eco-marathon Europe the NTNU team improved on the DNV GL Fuel Fighter 4 and reached 2nd place.

In 2019 the DNV GL Fuel Fighter 5 was built from the ground up. With a new design the team won the vehicle design award in the UrbanConcept class and got a 5th place in the UrbanConcept Battery Electric class.

== Design and technology ==
=== Body and engine ===
The original DNV Fuel Fighter was designed to be as light as possible. Weighing a total of 80 kg (176 lbs), the body is made entirely of carbon fiber and weighs about 20 kg (44 lbs). To minimize wind resistance, the car was tested in wind tunnels and then reshaped according to test results.

The car uses a 600 watt electric engine from SmartMotor called SP300,

The dimensions of the car is 2.5 meter long, 1.2 meter broad and 1 meter tall.

The original DNV Fuel Fighter had some alterations done to its tail the next years and a self designed engine was employed.

In 2012 the NTNU team introduced the DNV Fuel Fighter 2, a car at the same weight, but with a bigger and more streamlined exterior.

== Results ==
Car (Year)	Class (teams with valid attempts)	Position	Official result	Awards
Pure choice (2009)	Urban Concept Hydrogen (3)	2nd	792 km/l	Road Safety Award, Communications Award
DNV Fuel Fighter (2009)	Urban Concept Hydrogen (5)	1st	1246 km/l	CO_{2} Award
DNV Fuel Fighter (2010)	Urban Concept Hydrogen (5)	-	-	Communication and Marketing Award
DNV Fuel Fighter (2011)	Urban Concept Hydrogen (10)	2nd	99 km/kWh	
DNV Fuel Fighter 2 (2012)	Urban Concept Battery Electric (15)	5th	162.9 km/kWh	
DNV Fuel Fighter 2 (2013)	Urban Concept Battery Electric (19)	3rd	202 km/kWh	Communication Award, Design Award
DNV GL Fuel Fighter 2 (2014)	UrbanConcept Battery Electric (16)	3rd	198.7 km/kWh	
DNV GL Fuel Fighter Prototype (2014)	Prototype Battery Electric (28)	7th	612.8 km/kWh	
DNV GL Future (Fuel Fighter 3) (2015)	UrbanConcept Hydrogen (7)	-	-	
DNV GL Zero (2015)	Prototype Battery-electric (33)	11th	482.5 km/kWh	
DNV GL Fuel Fighter 3 (2016)	UrbanConcept Hydrogen (7)	-	-	
DNV GL Fuel Fighter 4 (2017)	UrbanConcept Battery Electric (8)	-	-	
DNV GL Fuel Fighter 4 (2018)	UrbanConcept Battery Electric (12)	2nd	176.4 km/kWh	
DNV GL Fuel Fighter 5 (2019)	UrbanConcept Battery Electric (14)	5th	180.7 km/kWh	Vehicle Design – UrbanConcept
