= Mizzou Hydrogen Car Team =

The Mizzou Hydrogen Car Team designs, builds and competes with an Urban Concept hydrogen fuel cell vehicle run by students at the University of Missouri in Columbia, Missouri. They recently competed with their vehicle named "Tigergen III" in the 2013 Shell Eco-Marathon. At the competition they achieved 8.8 mi/kWh which placed them 3rd in the UrbanConcept Hydrogen category. The team also won an off-track award for "Best Team Spirit"

== About the Team ==
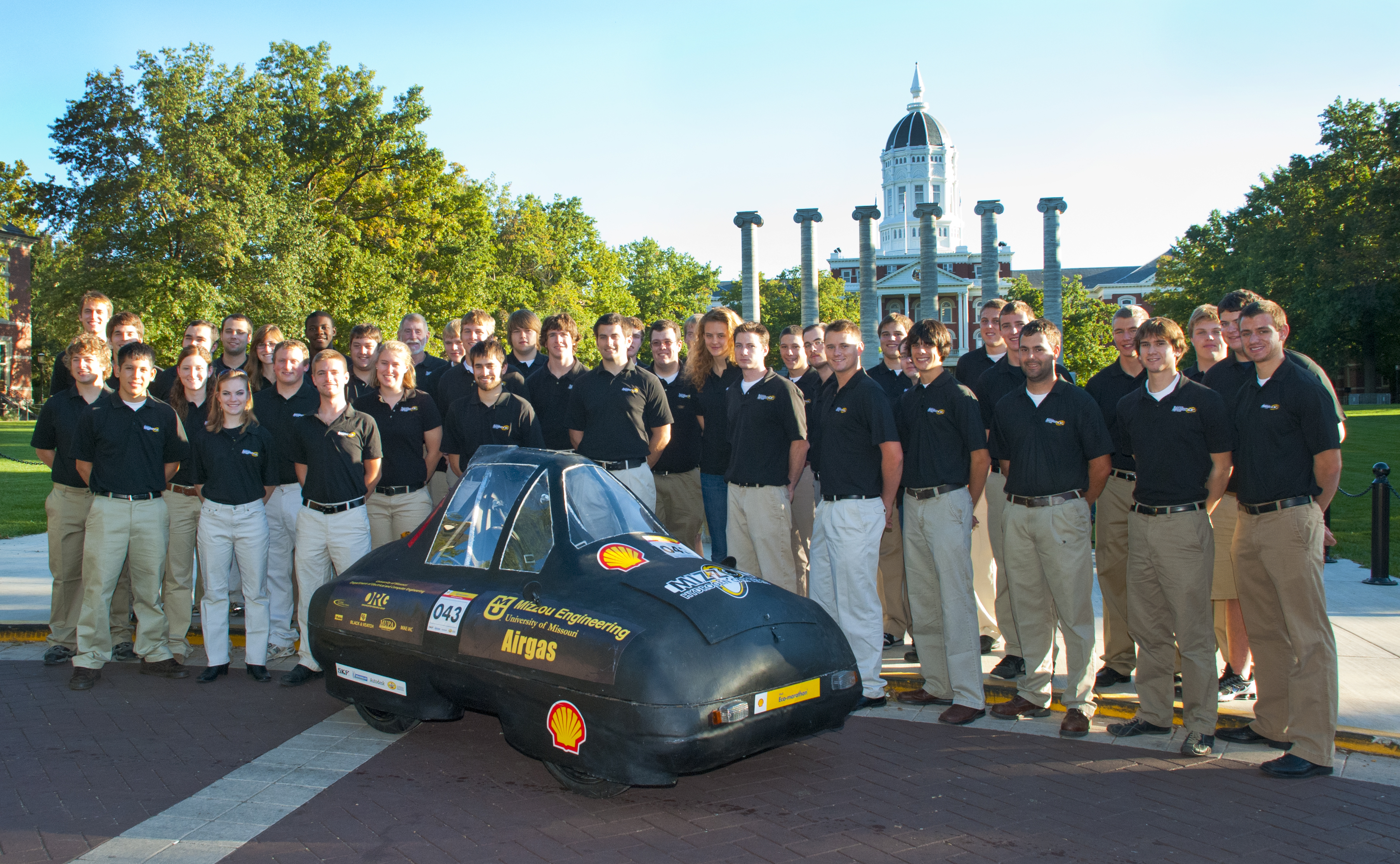
Tigergen II team photo

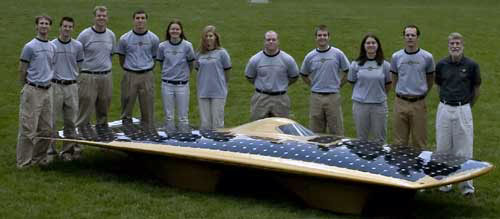
Suntiger 6 team photo

The team, located on the campus of the University of Missouri and run entirely by students, seeks to promote awareness of alternative fuels, develop technology, and allow members to gain practical experience through constructing a hydrogen vehicle. Advised by Professor Richard Whelove of the Mechanical and Aerospace Engineering Department, as well as Richard Wallace of the Electrical Engineering Department, the team was formerly known as the Mizzou Solar Car Team. The team switched over to hydrogen after 6 generations of solar cars. The team remains advised by Richard Whelove, alongside Michael Devaney of the Electrical Engineering Department. The team's first venture into hydrogen powered vehicles was with Tigergen I which ran on two 1.2 kW Ballard fuel cells and exhibitioned in the North American Solar Challenge as a demonstration vehicle. The team's second vehicle, Tigergen II, operated on a single 1.2 kW Ballard fuel cell and competed in the Urban Concept category of the Shell Eco Marathon, winning first place in the hydrogen category and fourth place overall in 2011. The team's current vehicle, Tigergen III, operates on two 1 kW Horizon fuel cells and competed Shell Eco Marathon Americas competition, placing third in the hydrogen UrbanConcept category.

== Current Technology ==
The body and chassis of Tigergen III is integrated as a partial-load bearing system in a partial-monocoque design. This construction technique saves weight without compromising the structural integrity of the vehicle. To further reduce weight, Tigergen III's partial monocoque structure is composed entirely of composite materials. Carbon fiber and nomex material is used extensively throughout the car. Tigergen III uses Horizon hydrogen fuels cell to convert energy from hydrogen gas into electricity which is then used to power the vehicle's electric motor. Safety is a priority in Tigergen III. The driver is secured with a five-point racing safety harness along with the driver being separated from all components of the fuel system by a fire-resistant bulkhead and easy access to a fire extinguisher. Tigergen III competed in the 2012 and 2013 Shell Eco-Marathons.

== Objectives of the Race ==
The purpose of the Shell Eco Marathon race is to drive as far as possible on the least fuel. The competition is based on efficiency rather than speed and awards are given to teams that use the least fuel while driving on a 6-mile circuit. The Urban Concept category subjects vehicles to constraints that resemble those of a consumer vehicle such as brake lights, luggage space, and four wheels along with stop-and-go driving. The next competition takes place March 2012 at Discovery Green in Houston, TX.

== Race results ==
=== 2010 Shell Eco Marathon ===
2011 Race Results
Run	mi/kWh	MPG	Driver
1	10.76	372	Jennifer Claybrooks
2	12.87	445	Jennifer Claybrooks
3	12.83	443	Jennifer Claybrooks
4	13.19	456	Jennifer Claybrooks
5	13.79	476	Jennifer Claybrooks
6	12.87	445	Andy McMullen

The team competed for the first time with their vehicle named "Tigergen II" in the Shell Eco-Marathon although it did not finish the race due to technical difficulties. The team was awarded a trophy and monetary prize for the "Perseverance in the Face of Adversity" as a result of the hard work they did to get the car working at the race.

=== 2011 Shell Eco Marathon ===
In 2011 the team competed for the second time with Tigergen II with much greater success than before. Tigergen II completed all six runs to receive six qualifying results. Run 2 experienced a technical problem but the fuel cell was rebooted and the run was completed. Of the six runs the highest efficiency obtained was on run "5" with 13.79 mi/kWh or 476 MPG. The team was awarded with First Prize for the Hydrogen Category in the Urban Concept Division. The team was also awarded a trophy and monetary prize for "Best Team Spirit"
