= Inline skate wheel setup =

Configurations and layouts

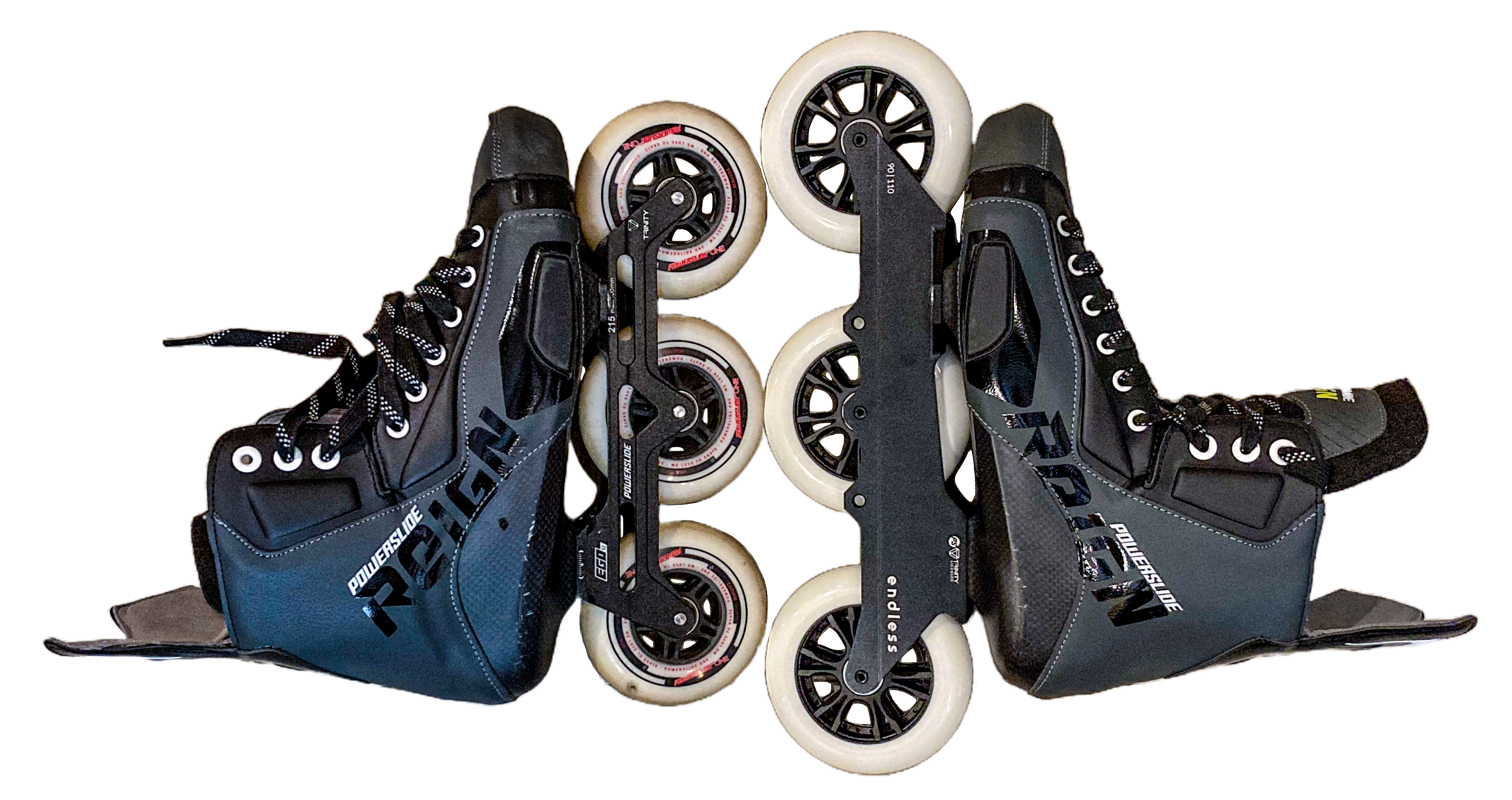
Same boot with different wheel setups

Inline skate wheel setup can refer to various aspects related to the selection and configuration of inline skate wheels. The total number of wheels and their diameter are often expressed in the form {number of wheels} x {wheel diameter in mm}. For instance, a common recreational skate setup is 4x80mm, which means four wheels, each with a diameter of 80 millimeters. Wheel arrangement patterns are typically named according to the profile formed by the wheels at their contact points with the ground. In a flat setup, all wheels maintain contact with the ground simultaneously. A classic rockered setup, by contrast, creates a banana-like profile along the bottom.

== Flat setup ==
Flat wheel setup: 4x80mm

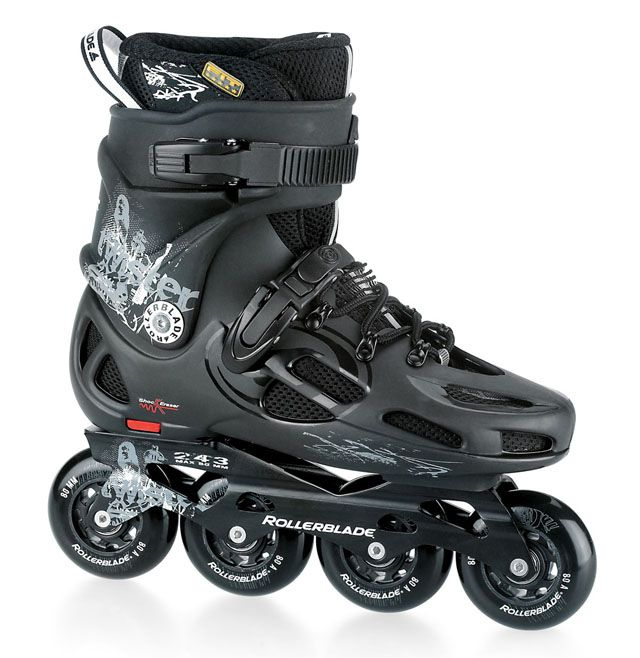
Standard flat setup

A flat setup is the most common wheel configuration used on inline skates. The majority of non-aggressive skates are sold with this arrangement. In a flat setup, all wheels make contact with the ground simultaneously when the skate is rolling on a level surface. While not as maneuverable as a rockered setup, a flat setup excels in disciplines that prioritize speed, stability, and long-distance efficiency. It is the standard choice for speed skaters and marathon skaters. Flat wheel setups are typically noted in the format {number of wheels} x {wheel diameter in mm}. For example, a common recreational setup is 4x80mm or simply 4x80, indicating four wheels, each with a diameter of 80 millimeters.

Because all wheels in a flat setup share the skater’s weight, the load is distributed evenly across the entire frame. This balanced distribution reduces individual wheel wear and increases the overall load-bearing capacity of the skate. Each wheel deforms less under load, resulting in a smaller wheel footprint with the ground. This helps to minimize rolling resistance and improve efficiency.

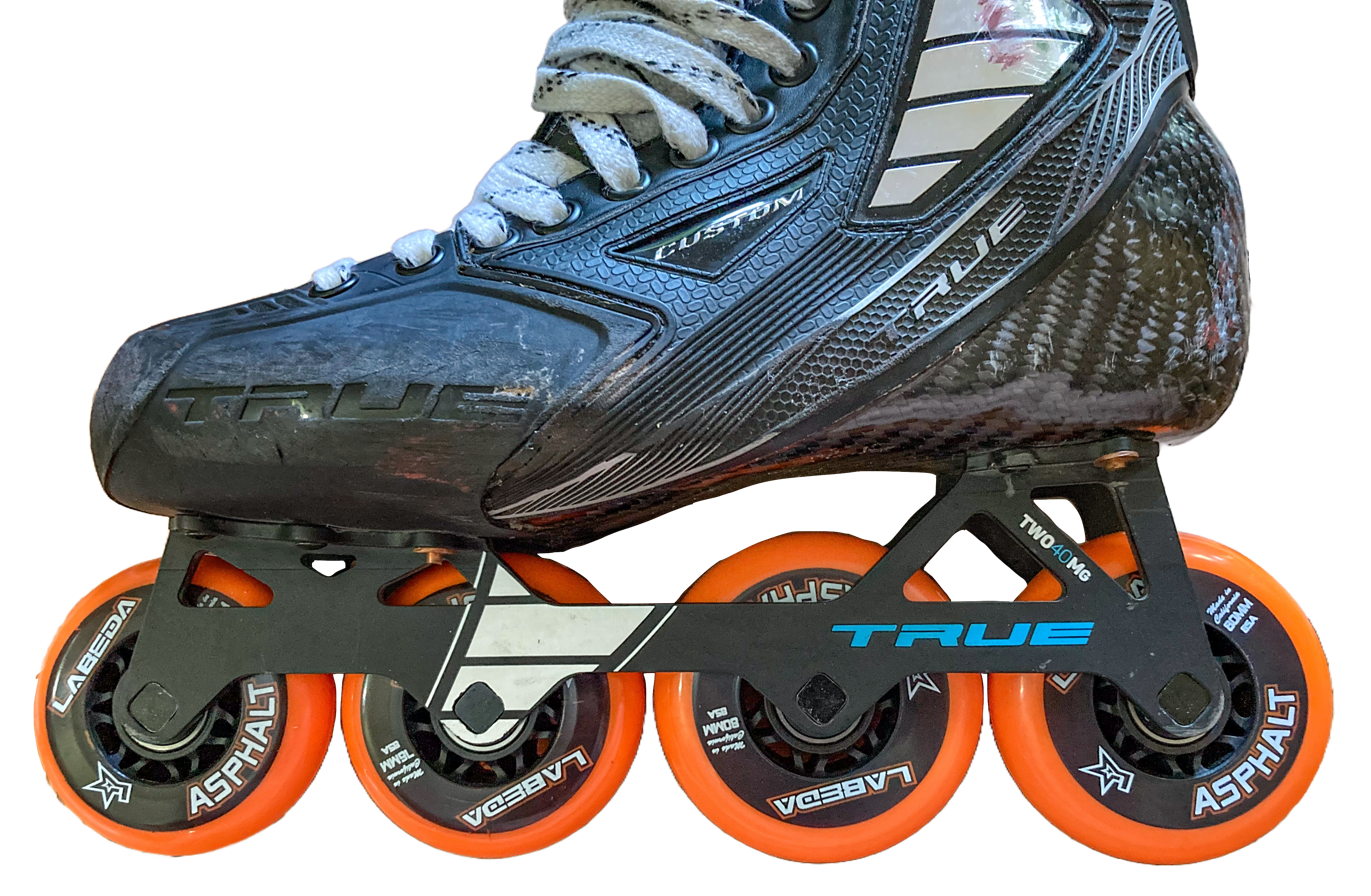
Hockey hi-lo setup

A flat setup does not require all wheels to be the same size, nor does it require all axles to sit on the same horizontal plane within the frame. The hi-lo setup is a good example of this. Although many skaters mistakenly consider the hi-lo setup a type of rockering, it is in fact a variation of the flat setup. Because all wheels maintain ground contact at the same time, a hi-lo setup confers upon a skater the same stability as a flat setup. Some hi-lo configurations use wheels of varying diameters to create a forward-leaning stance, while others achieve the same effect by positioning the axles at different heights within the frame.

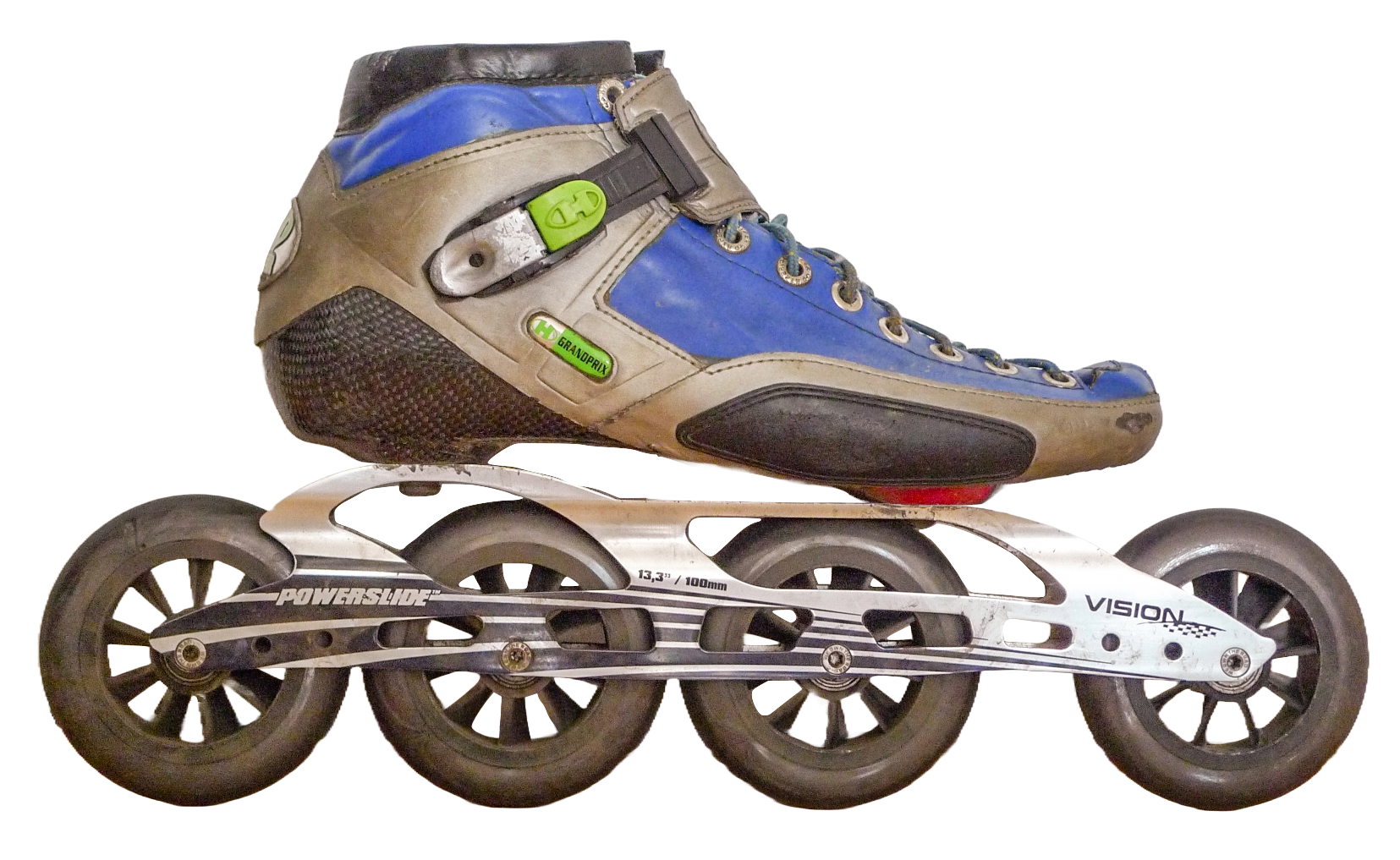
Speed skate on a 165mm frame with a relocated 2nd wheel

With the growing trend toward larger wheels, the front mounting platform on traditional 165mm frames began to interfere with the second or third wheel. To address this, some 165mm frames were redesigned to reposition the middle wheels or to use smaller middle wheels. These adaptations are still variations of the flat setup, as all wheels maintain simultaneous contact with the ground. For example, the ROCKIN’ MIX4 100/90 frame changes the axle heights and wheel diameters of the two middle wheels while maintaining a flat contact profile. Similarly, speed skates using large wheels on 165mm frames often relocate and reduce the size of the second wheel to prevent interference while retaining flat setup characteristics.

== Rockered setup ==
Rockering with frame hardware

A rockered setup, also called a full rockered setup or banana rocker, involves altering the wheel alignment to increase maneuverability. In a four-wheel inline skate, this typically means raising the bottom of the front and rear wheels by about 2 millimeters, so that only the two middle wheels touch the ground when standing on a flat surface. This setup mimics the profile of an ice skate blade, and is known as the "banana rocker" after its curved profile.

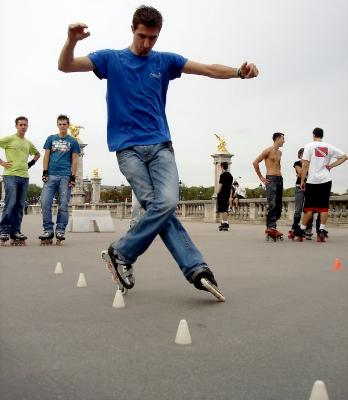
Freestyle slalom

A rockered setup generally produces the opposite skating characteristics of a flat setup. It offers much greater maneuverability and allows for quicker, easier turning. Freestyle slalom skaters and artistic inline skaters consider the rockered setup indispensable, as it enables gliding on just the front two wheels, the middle two wheels, or the rear two wheels, depending on the move. Having a short frame in combination with a full rocker is optimum for achieving the highest maneuverability when skating. However, this setup makes it more difficult to maintain stability at high speeds, since the skater cannot glide on all four wheels at once and is more prone to wheel wobbles when skating in a straight line.

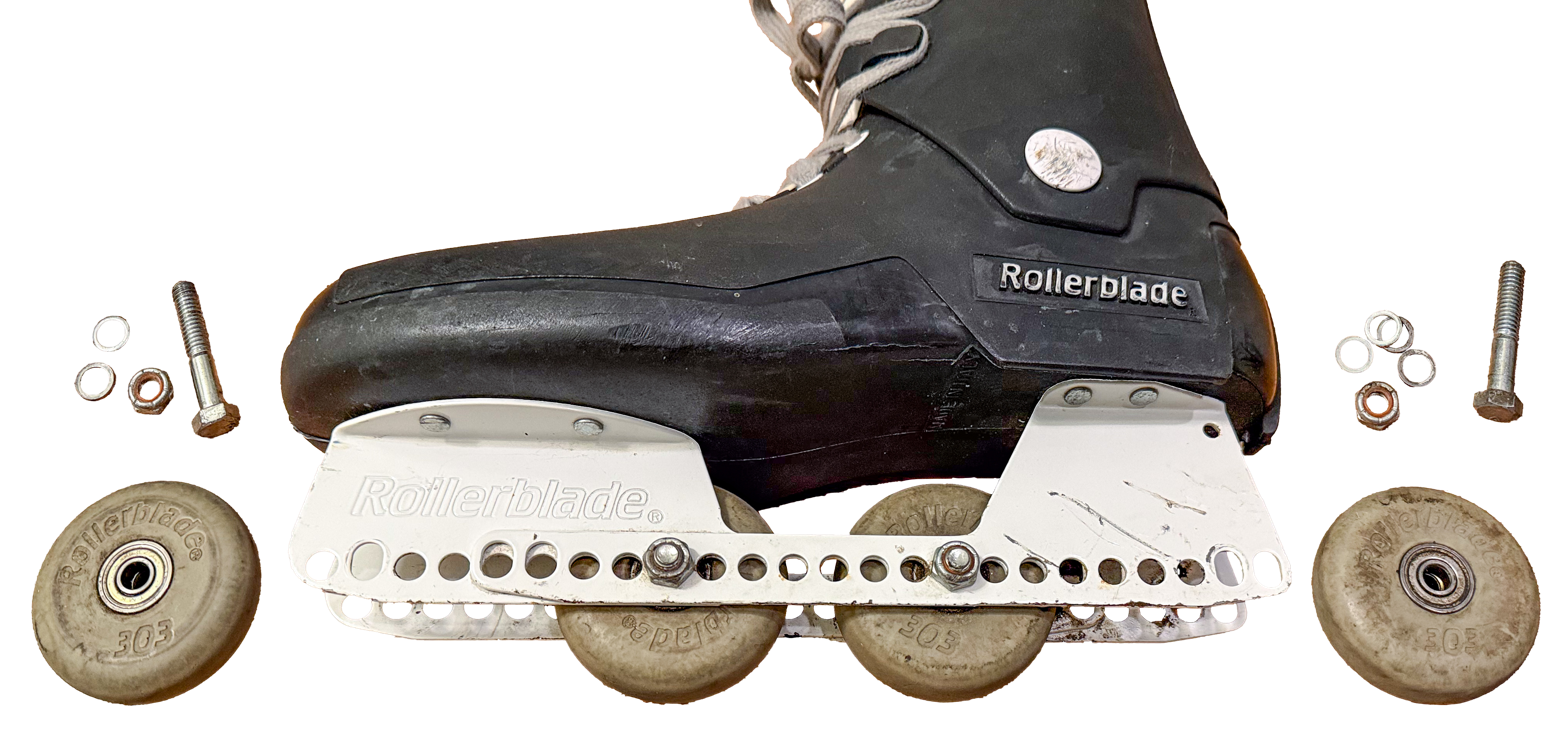
Early rockerable frame (1980s)

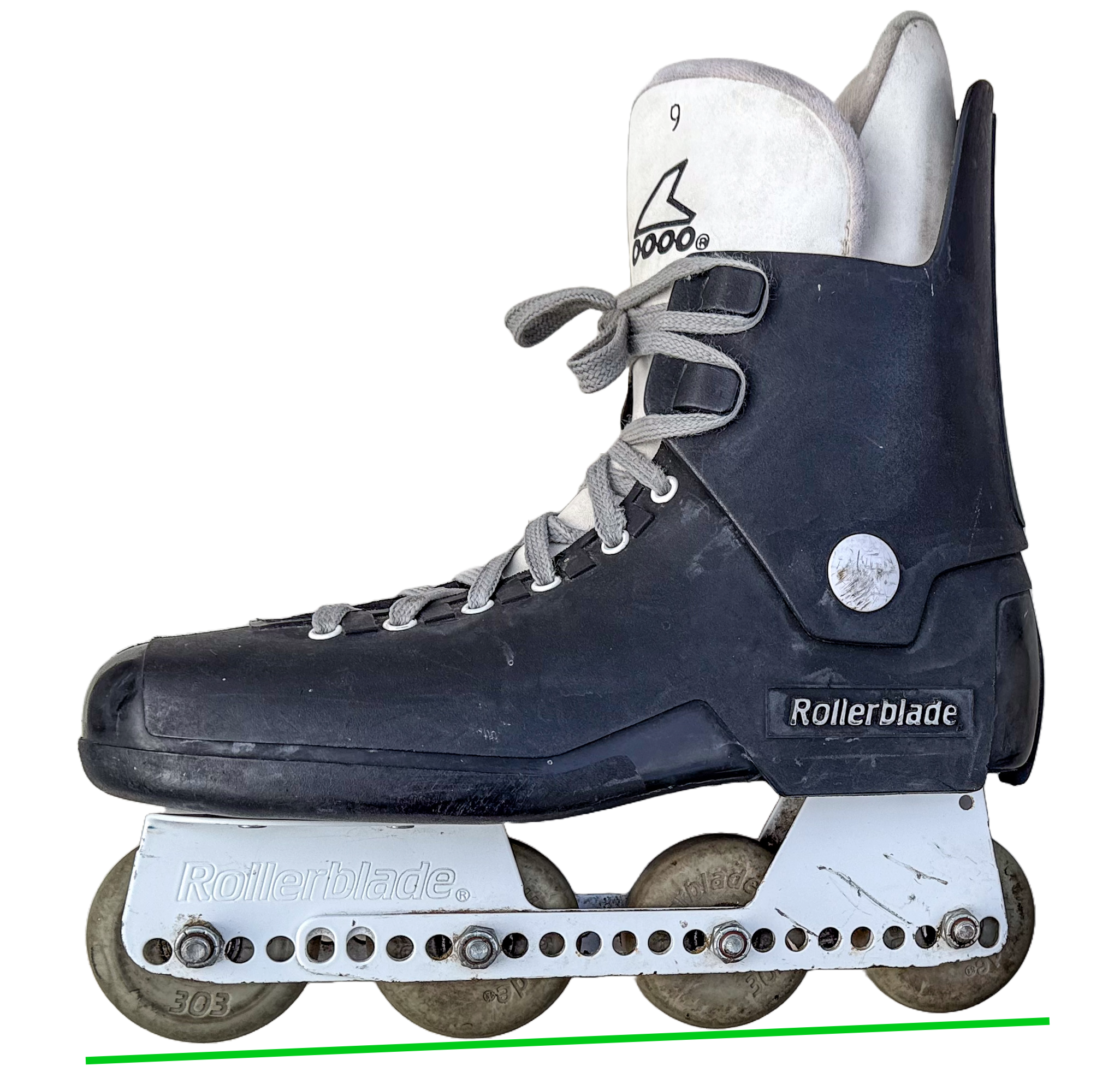
70-70-70-70 rockered

Although rockering is now widely associated with slalom skaters and Wizard skaters, this was not always the case. When modern Rollerblade skates were first introduced in the 1980s by Scott Olson, their frames were specifically designed to support both flat and rockered setups. Predecessors inline skates such as the Chicago skates, USSR skates, and Super Sport Skate also allowed skaters to switch between the two configurations. These skates featured rockerable frames, typically using oblong mounting holes or alternate hole positions to accommodate both setups. Early competitors like Ultra Wheels likewise offered frames with optional rockering. Over time, more refined toggleable hardware was developed, including frame spacers, axle guides, and mounting hole inserts, to make switching between configurations faster and more reliable. (Note: See pictures of the new generation of early Rollerblade skates with heel brakes, from Vintage Minnesota Hockey: picture, picture, picture and picture, archived here, here, here and here. These have a refined version of the adjustable frame from the Ultimate Street Skate, and a similar hard boot. These skates witnessed the transition of Scott Olson's company from "Ole's Innovative Sports", to "North American Sports Training Corp.", and finally to "Rollerblade", as attested by marketing materials.)

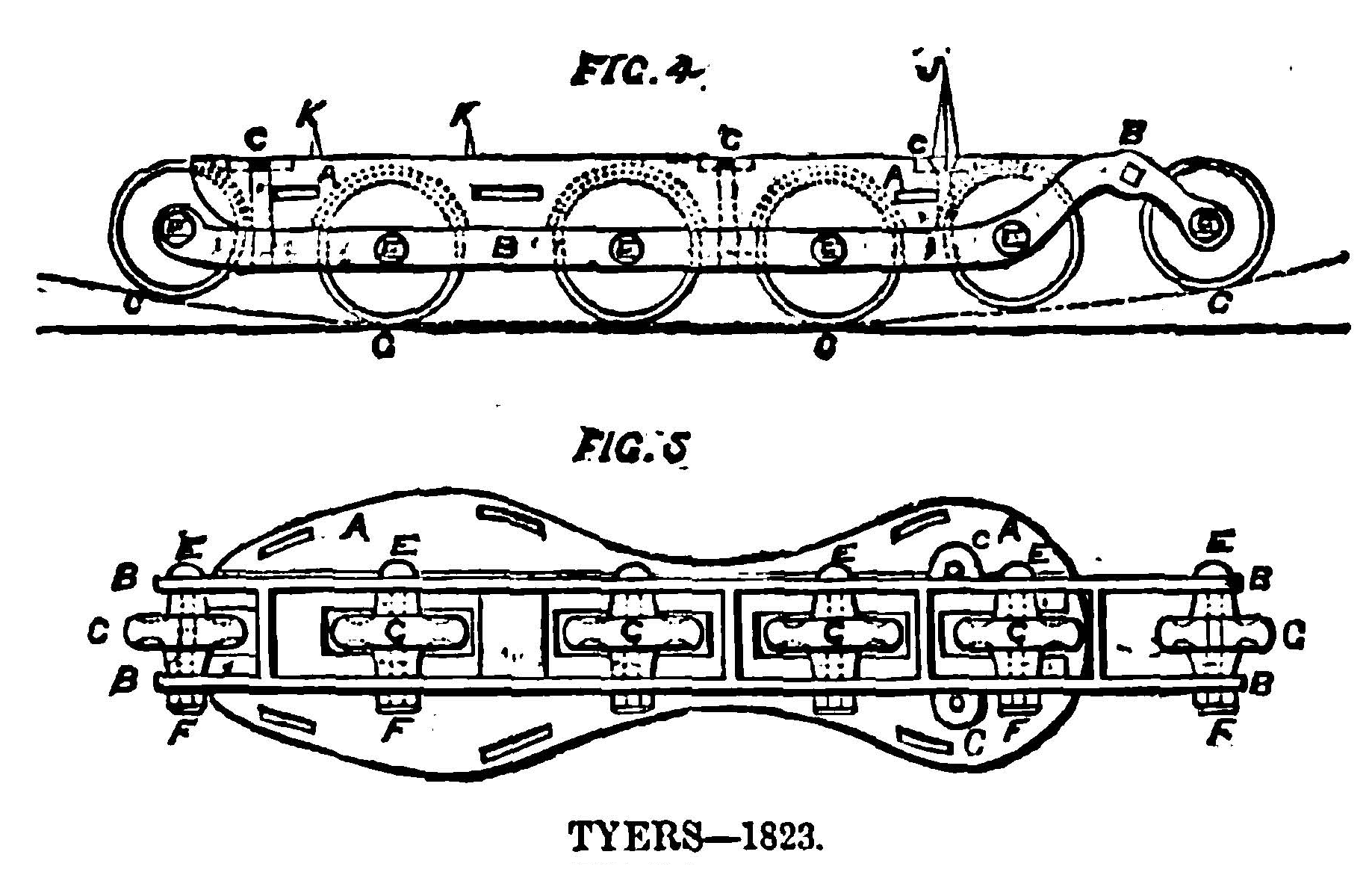
Tyers's rockered Volito (1823)

Modern inline skate design was heavily influenced by ice hockey. Olson’s 1985 book Rollerblades: Dryland Training for Ice Hockey, the first published work on inline skating, reflects this focus. The book aimed to establish inline skates as direct counterparts to ice hockey skates. Ice hockey blades are rockered by default, and this standard carried over to the emerging sport of inline skating. The book concluded with a chapter covering wheels, wheel rotation, and the differences between flat and rockered setups. In fact, the desire to emulate curved ice blades can be traced back to the earliest roller skates. Robert John Tyers’s Volito skates, patented in 1823, featured a pronounced rocker. Similarly, Henry Pennie’s 1861 design included what would now be called a front rocker setup.

The popularity of rockering declined in the 1990s with the rise of aggressive skating. Early aggressive bladers preferred a flat wheel setup, but many eventually adopted the anti-rocker configuration, which used smaller middle wheels that did not touch the ground. It would take another two decades before aggressive skaters re-discovered rockered setups and pre-rockered frames, led by the Wizard skating movement that emerged in the early 2010s.

Rockering by sizing wheels: 76-80-80-76

A frame designed for a flat setup can still be converted into a rockered configuration by mounting smaller wheels at the front and rear. For example, a standard 4x80mm flat frame can become rockered by installing 76 mm wheels at the front and rear, while keeping 80 mm wheels in the middle. This customization creates a 2 mm height offset between the outer and middle wheels, mimicking the standard banana rocker profile. Skaters commonly notate mixed wheel sizes in millimeters, listed from the rear wheel to the front. The rockered configuration described above is typically written as 76-80-80-76.

== Natural rocker ==
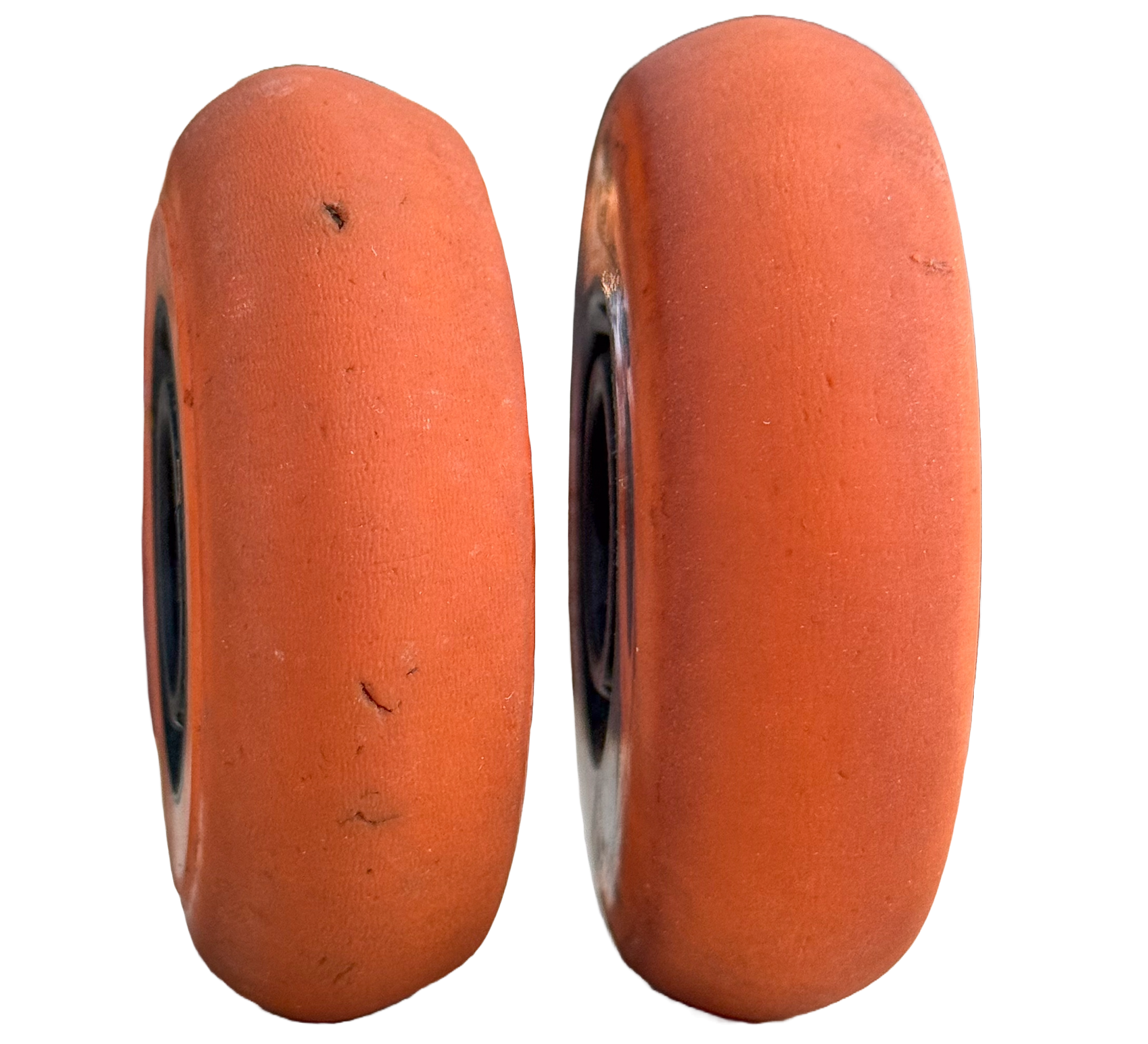
Severely worn (left) vs moderately worn (right)

Natural rockering can also occur through regular use, on a flat frame. Beginners often wear down the front wheels faster than the rear ones, resulting in a natural hi-lo setup over time without the need for purchase and install different-sized wheels. Similarly, certain skating patterns wear the front and rear wheels more than the middle ones, gradually creating a natural rocker. Skaters who want to restore a flat setup with worn wheels can use specific rotation patterns to even out wheel size. However, when a rocker is desired, rotation strategies can instead be used to enhance the effect. For example, wheels can be sorted by remaining diameter, and the most worn ones placed back at the front and rear to maintain a consistent rocker across rotations.

Although natural rockering typically results in a height difference smaller than the standard 2 mm, this more subtle profile is often preferred by skaters who are not focused on slalom. In particular, big-wheel urban skaters and participants in the Wizard skating movement of the 2010s and 2020s promote their factory-tuned, pre-rockered frames as recreating the feel of a naturally worn rocker, despite being fitted with brand new wheels of identical diameter. Wizard even named its classic four-wheel frame NR, after "natural rocker".

== Front rocker ==
Front rocker wheel setup: 80-80-80-76

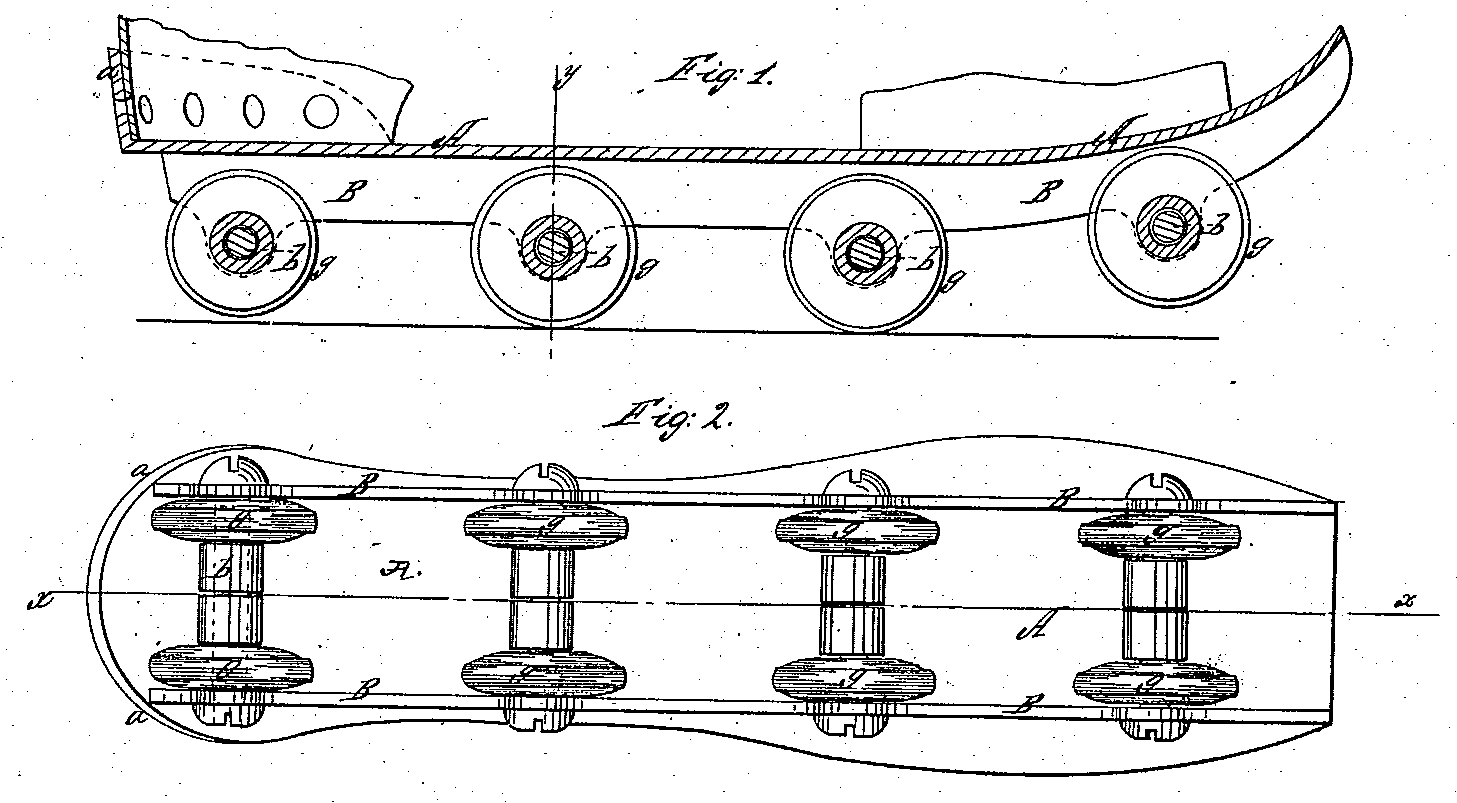
Front rockered skate (1861)

A front rocker setup raises only the front wheel, while the remaining three wheels stay in a flat configuration. This design serves as a compromise between a full rockered setup and a flat setup. By gliding and striding primarily on the three rear wheels, the skater achieves greater top speed and improved stability, with less wheel wobble than in a full rockered setup. At the same time, the raised front wheel enhances maneuverability during turns, offering better agility than a fully flat setup when rolling on the front two wheels.

This raised front wheel also helps guide the skate more smoothly over uneven terrain, reducing the chance of catching or tripping on surface imperfections. This feature is particularly valuable in urban environments. When a single pair of skates needs to perform well across different terrains and skating styles, such as riding stairs, navigating city streets, or playing hockey, the front rocker setup provides a versatile and balanced solution.

== Hi-lo setup ==
Hi-lo hockey frame

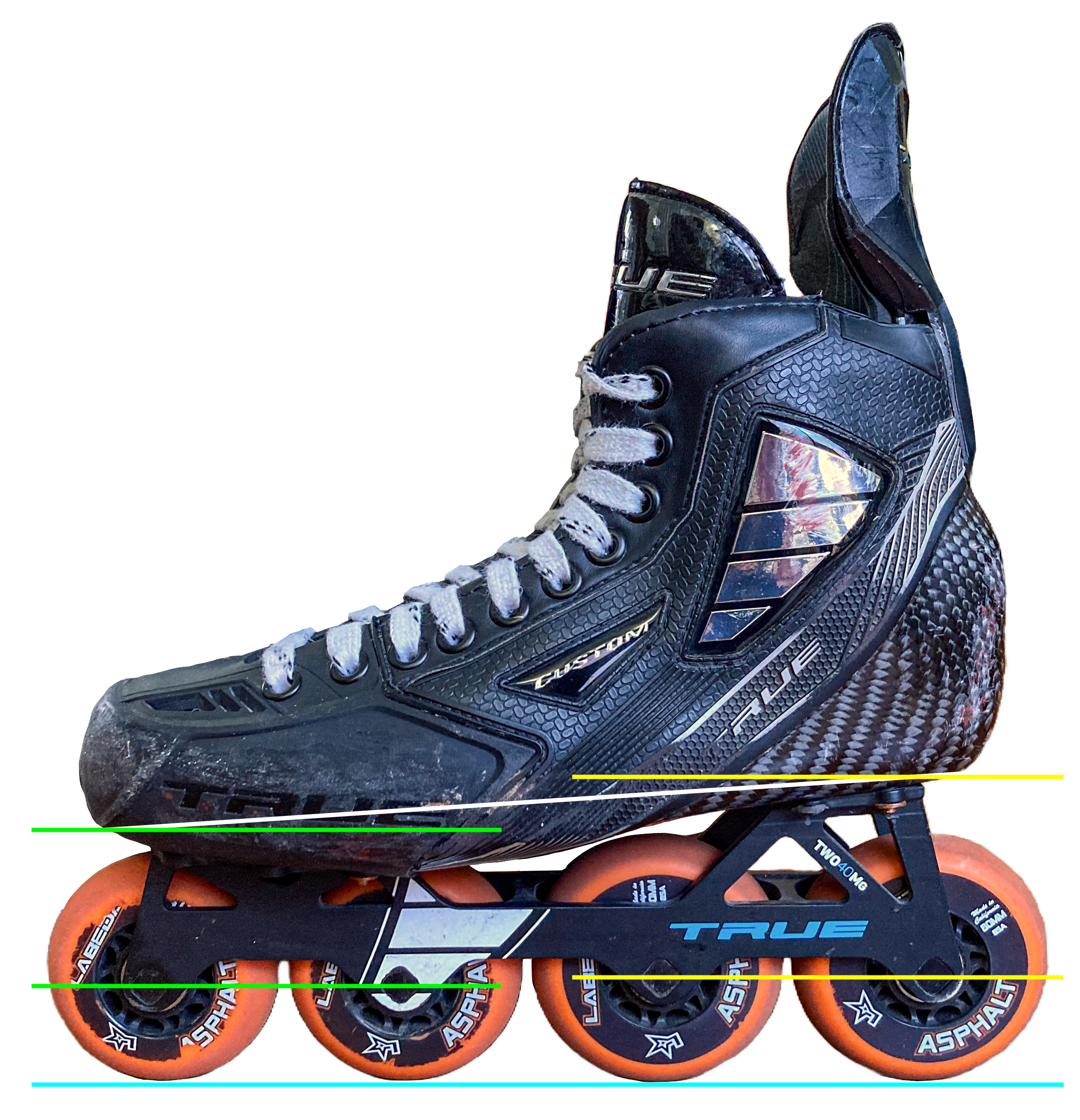
80-80-76-76 hi-lo hockey frame pitches a boot forward

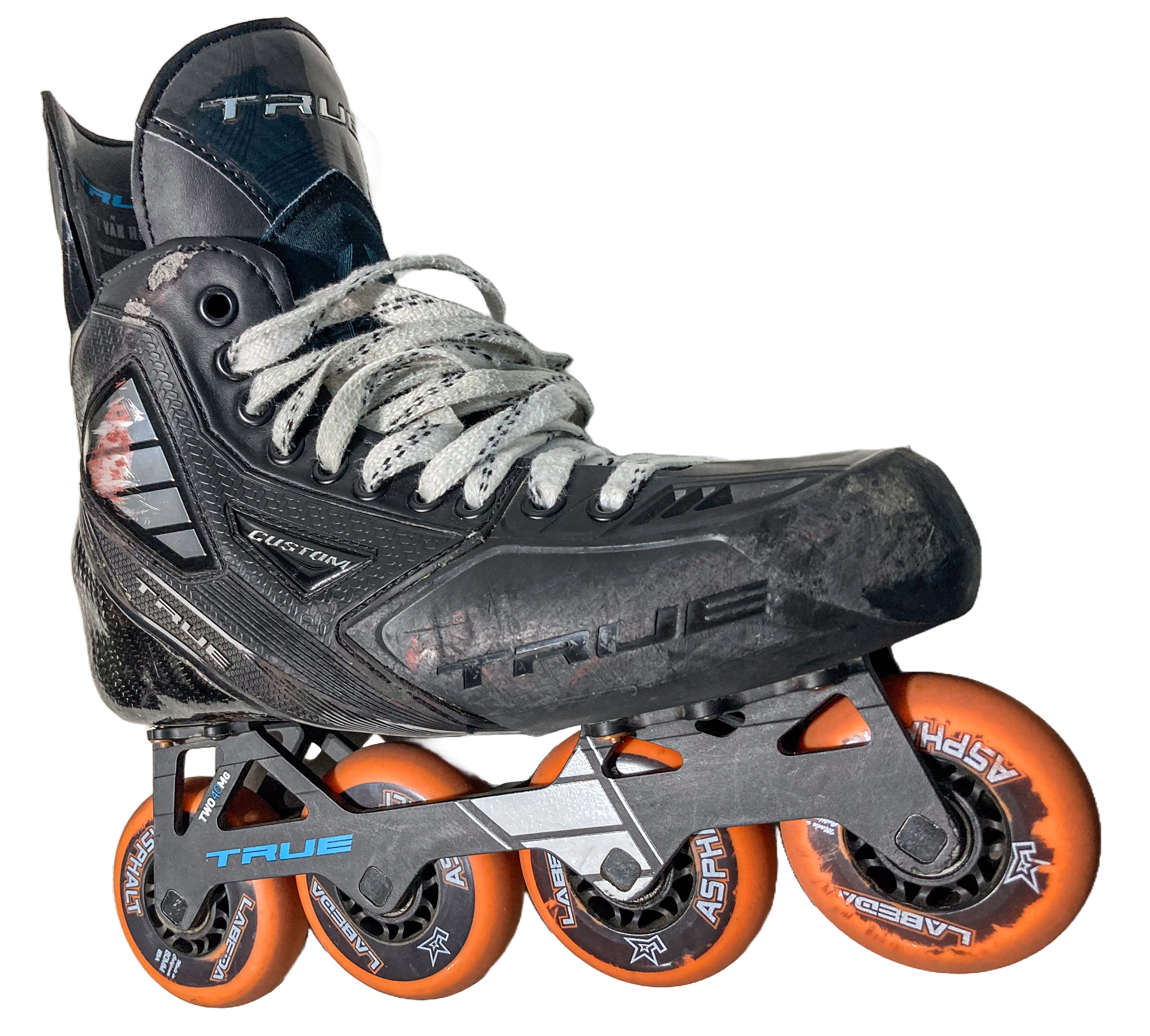
Front mount lowered

The hi-lo setup, also known as HiLo, is commonly found in hockey skates. Hi-lo is technically a flat setup, since all wheels maintain contact with the ground when the skate rests on a level surface. The term “hi-lo” refers not to the wheel contact profile, but to the orientation of the boot. It raises the heel and lowers the toe, creating a heel-to-toe drop that encourages a natural forward lean. This forward flex promotes a more aggressive stance, enhances push-off power, and helps prevent backward falls. Unlike terms like “flat” or “rockered,” which describe how wheels touch the ground, “hi-lo” describes how the boot is angled forward.

This forward pitch can be achieved through a combination of frame design and wheel sizing. The mounting platforms on the frame may feature a built-in height offset between the heel and toe areas, resulting in a heel lift. This design is common in hockey skates and is standard on 165mm, 195mm, and Trinity mounting systems. However, raising the heel increases the overall ride height, which can reduce control and stability. To counter this, the ride height can be lowered by reducing the size of the front wheels without changing the boot's pitch. Hi-lo hockey frames place the axles at progressively lower positions from heel to toe, with progressively smaller wheels, allowing the front of the boot to sit as low as possible. This design maintains the forward lean while restoring a lower ride height, combining better power transfer during push-offs with improved control and stability.

Hi-lo setups with smaller front wheels are often marketed as providing quicker acceleration, while the larger rear wheels are said to help with achieving and maintaining top speed. While it is true that smaller wheels accelerate more quickly and larger wheels maintain speed more easily, these performance traits are not the reason for the hi-lo configuration. The smaller front wheels are used out of necessity - to lower the toe of the boot and preserve the forward pitch - rather than for their isolated performance benefits alone. In practice, the smaller front wheels trade top speed for a lower and more stable ride. (Note: Misleading marketing is common, where hi-lo frames are advertised as offering quicker acceleration due to the smaller front wheels and higher top speeds thanks to the larger rear wheels. These claims often ignore the primary design purpose: creating forward lean by allowing the front of the boot to sit lower, which enhances forward pitch and skating posture. See for instance, Hi-lo Frames from Powerslide (archived here), and A Guide to Roller Hockey Wheels from Willies (archived here). If these marketing claims were entirely accurate, we would expect to see hockey frames with extremely small front wheels (e.g. 50 mm) and oversized rear wheels (e.g. 110 mm) to further enhance acceleration and top speed, without any design features to leverage vacated front space to pitch the boot forward. In reality, such frames do not exist.)

Bauer and Mission helped popularize a type of hi-lo hockey frame in which the two front axles are positioned 2 mm lower than the rear. These frames typically use two 80 mm wheels in the back and two 76 mm wheels in the front, annotated as 80-80-76-76. This setup maintains full ground contact while adding a 4 mm heel-to-toe height offset, enhancing the forward pitch of the skate.

Many skaters casually refer to any mixed-size wheel configuration as a "rocker," which leads to the common but inaccurate use of the term "hi-lo rocker" to describe a standard hi-lo setup. This is a poor choice of words, as the hi-lo setup is a flat configuration - all wheels touch the ground, with no front or rear rockering. The confusion deepens when a standard hi-lo setup is further modified by lifting the front and rear wheels, prompting some to call it a "full hi-lo rocker" instead of the more accurate "hi-lo with rocker" or simply "rockered hi-lo." Some skaters also misuse "rocker" as a general synonym for "wheel setup", leading to additional confusion, such as referring to a flat setup as a "flat rocker". (Note: Even professional skaters occasionally write "hi-lo rocker" when they mean "hi-lo flat". See Thierstein, for instance. Redditors often write "hi-lo rocker", using the word "rocker" for any mixed-size wheel configuration. See this, this and this, for instance.) (Note: Even professional skaters occasionally write "flat rocker" when they mean "flat setup". See This Is Soul, Big Wheel Blading, and Naomi's book, for instance.)

== Alternatives to hi-lo ==
Hi-lo by sizing wheels: 80-78-76-74

Hi-lo through rotation

Hi-lo frames are not the only approach to achieving a pitched boot with a low ride height. For instance, a hi-lo setup can be created using a standard flat frame by fitting progressively smaller wheels from rear to front. The last axle is fitted with the largest wheel that the frame can accommodate - typically 80 mm for a hockey frame. A height offset is then selected based on the desired degree of forward pitch, commonly 2 mm per wheel. Thus each wheel is 2 mm smaller in diameter than the one behind it, resulting in a configuration written as 80-78-76-74. This arrangement produces a total heel-to-toe height offset of 6 mm while maintaining full ground contact.

Instead of purchasing wheels in different diameters, a skater can gradually create a hi-lo setup through a hi-lo rotation strategy. This method involves sorting worn wheels by remaining diameter, placing the most worn wheels at the front and the least worn at the rear. Once the desired forward pitch is achieved, it can be maintained across future rotations by discarding the most worn wheel and adding a new one at the rear. This approach also minimizes noticeable changes in ride height between rotations, offering a consistent skating feel over time.

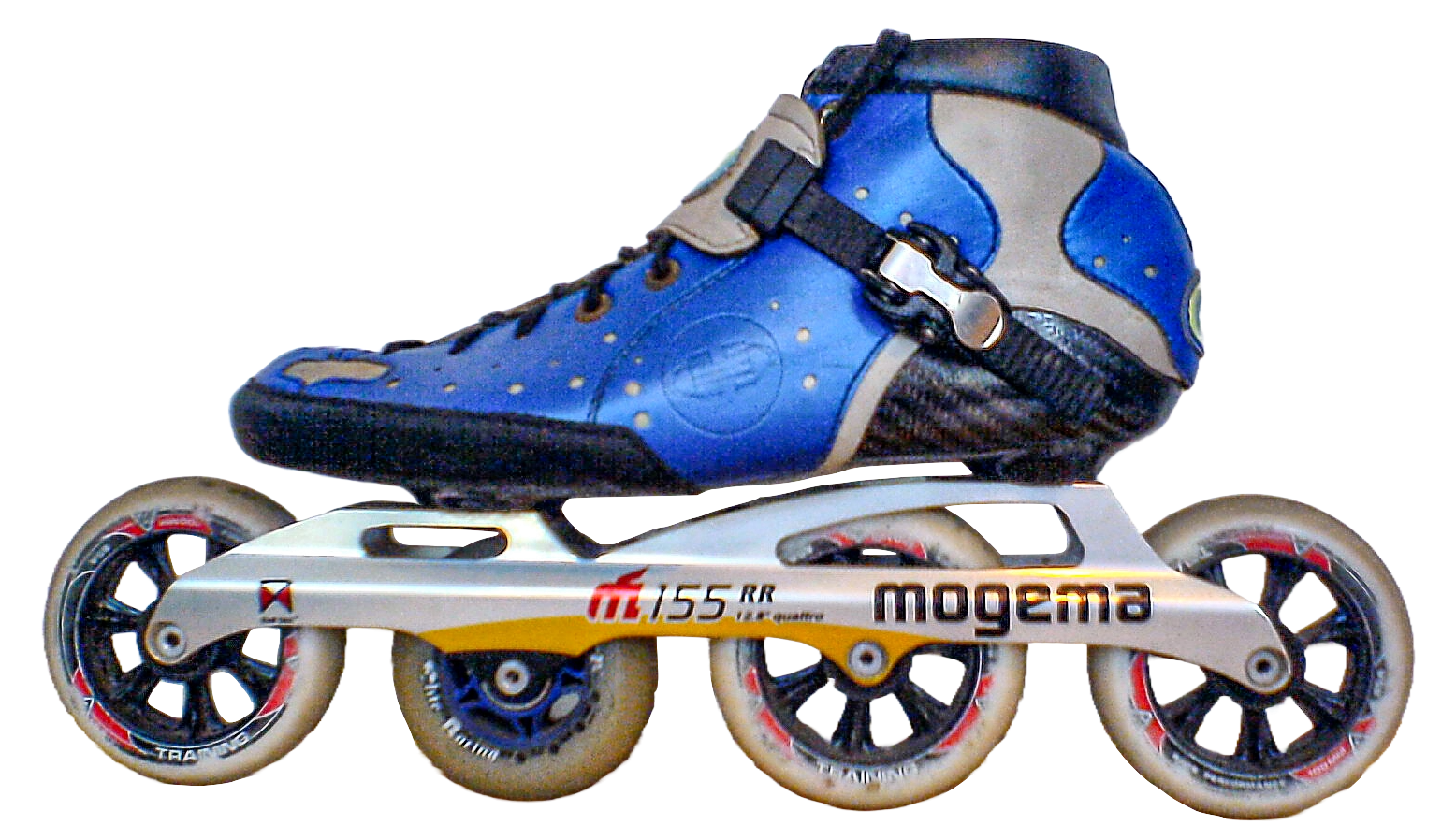
Smaller 2nd wheel

Speed skaters, for example, also benefit from forward flex and a low center of gravity, while favoring the use of increasingly larger wheels for performance gains. However, larger wheels raise the overall ride height, adding to the elevation already introduced by a heel lift. To address this, some 165mm frames are designed with a relocated second axle or a smaller second wheel. These modifications create clearance that allows the front of the boot to sit lower, enabling the use of 100 mm or larger wheels while keeping ride height to a minimum.

The MIX4 100/90 frame from ROCKIN' takes a similar approach to lowering ride height by using smaller middle wheels and repositioning the middle axles. This 165mm frame supports two 100 mm outer wheels and two 90 mm middle wheels, forming a 100-90-90-100 flat setup. As a result, the entire boot sits noticeably lower to the ground.

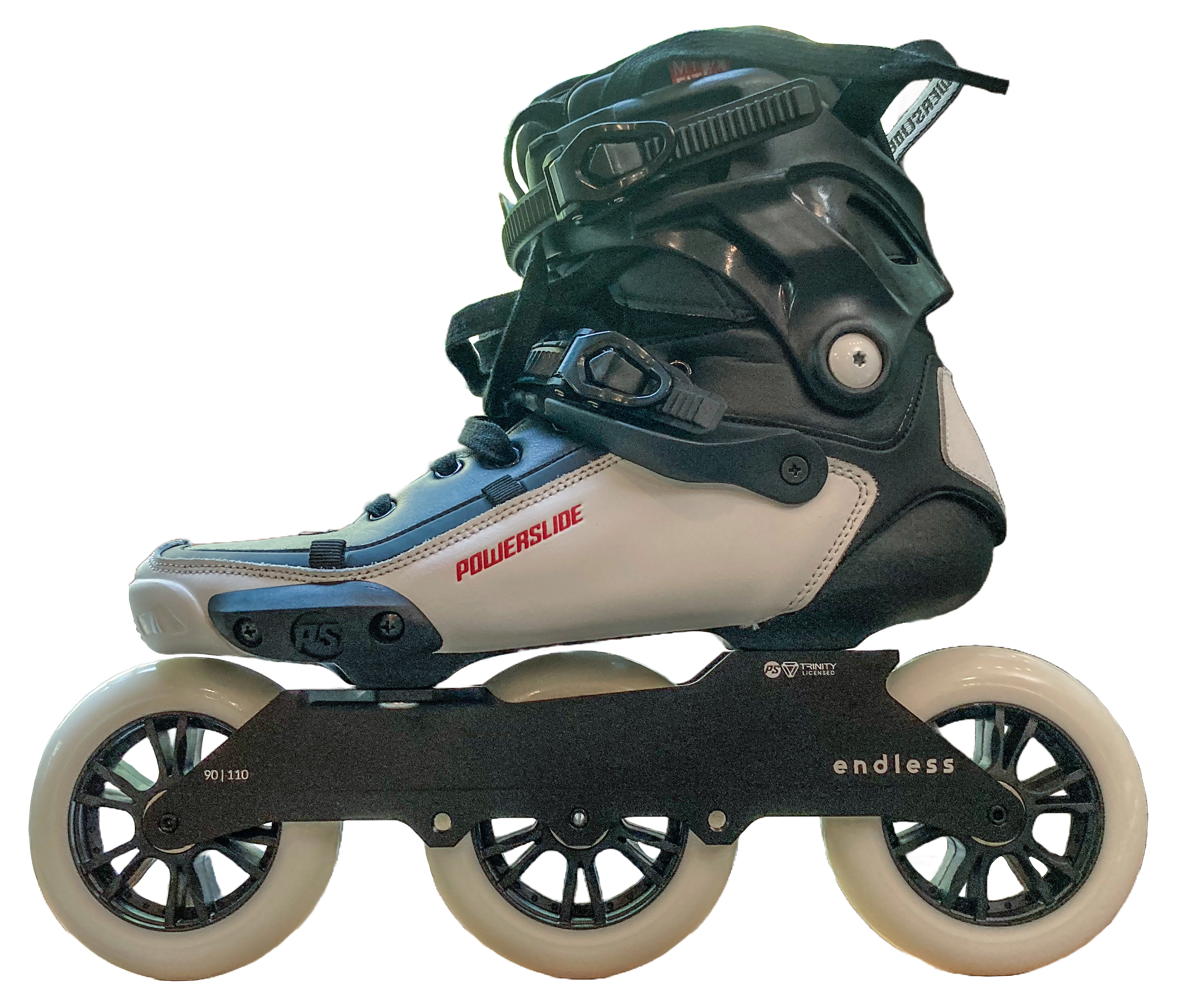
Trinity mounting

The Trinity mounting system offers another solution for combining forward pitch with a low ride height. Unlike the 165mm and 195mm standards, which use a single front mounting point, Trinity frames use two front mounting points positioned on either side of the boot’s centerline. This leaves the centerline clear where the front wheels are located, allowing those wheels to be placed much closer to the sole of the boot. As a result, the front of the boot can sit just millimeters above the front wheels. For example, an Endless Trinity 90 frame configured in a 3x110mm flat setup positions the toe approximately 110 mm from the ground.

Wizard frames use the UFS mounting standard, which is designed for boots with a flat, level sole and no built-in forward pitch. Classic Wizard frames, such as the Wizard NR90, use wheels of equal size but still manage to angle the boot forward. This is achieved by incorporating a sloped mounting surface into the frame itself. However, the overall ride height is typically higher compared to Trinity setups, due to the limitations of the UFS mounting system.

== Forward lean with a rocker ==
A new variation of rockered skating emerged in the early 2010s, led by a new generation of aggressive skaters who rediscovered the benefits of rockered setups, this time using larger wheels on longer frames. This approach stood in stark contrast to the anti-rocker setups with small wheels and short frames that had dominated aggressive skating for years.

Wizard NR with Natural Rocker

One of the key pioneers of this movement is Wizard Skating, founded by Leon Basin. Still a leading influence in the 2020s, Wizard frames are designed for flat UFS boots but incorporate a subtly sloped mounting surface to introduce a slight forward lean, similar to the effect of a hi-lo flat setup. The Wizard NR frame is "pre-rockered", and features a mild banana rocker named after the natural rocker. The NR90 model of this NR family accommodates four wheels of the same size, in a 90-90-90-90 rockered configuration.

Endless 90: Balanced Rocker

Similarly, the Endless Blading 90 frame is pre-rockered to support four 90 mm wheels. This setup, branded as the Balanced Rocker, is another mild version of the banana rocker. The frame uses the 165mm mounting standard, which inherently includes a forward pitch built into the boot-frame interface.

Ninja NN 90 with V.m Rocker

Another example is the Ninja NN 90 frame from NN Skates, which also features a pre-rockered design. It is available in UFS, 165mm, and Trinity mount versions. Both the 165mm and Trinity versions naturally provide forward lean as part of their respective mounting standards. The NN 90 introduces NN Skates' proprietary V.m Rocker, short for "modified V Rocker" which evolved from the brand’s first-generation "rear rocker" design.

Artificially pivoted view

All of these pre-rockered frames are variations of the full rockered setup, combined with built-in forward lean. However, they are sometimes marketed using simplified illustrations that "horizon-correct" the top surface of the frame, showing the boot level and the skate pivoting primarily on the third wheel. This artificial stance is often described as a "V-shaped" wheel-contact profile, a "V rocker," or a "3rd-wheel down" configuration. In practice, however, skaters do not glide on a single wheel. Instead, they roll on two wheels at a time, as is typical in all rockered setups. When rolling on the second and third wheels, the boot naturally tilts forward into a toe-down posture, similar to what occurs in a hi-lo setup.

Some skaters therefore refer to this combination of forward pitch and rocker as the "hi-lo rocker" or full hi-lo rocker. However, these terms can be confusing, especially since "hi-lo rocker" is also used colloquially to describe standard hi-lo setups, and even flat setups are sometimes called "flat rockers". Naomi Grigg described this setup as a hi-lo frame with a banana rocker. At present, however, there is no consistent industry terminology for this specific combination of banana rocker and forward lean in a pre-rockered frame.

== Anti-rocker setup ==
Typical anti-rocker setup

The anti-rocker setup is the most widely used wheel configuration among aggressive skaters. It gets its name from being the opposite of a rockered setup. In an anti-rocker configuration, the two middle wheels are raised off the ground, leaving only the front and rear wheels to make contact on flat surfaces. The middle wheels are typically spaced farther apart than in standard four-wheel setups, and are often made of harder materials with minimal grip. These hard wheels are commonly referred to as grindwheels, antirockers, or anti-rocker wheels.

Grindwheels are not intended for rolling and rarely touch the ground, except on uneven terrain like ramps. Smaller, harder, and widely spaced, they are designed for one task alone: to make grinding on ledges and rails easier. By reducing the risk of wheel bite, they help guide the skate into position, allowing the H-block to lock more securely onto street obstacles during grinds.

Compared to a flat setup, the anti-rocker setup is not well suited for regular inline skating. With only two wheels rolling, the skate is slower, less stable, and more difficult to turn. The outer wheels wear down faster and offer a rougher ride. However, a skater using a flat setup will struggle to grind effectively on street obstacles, where the larger middle wheels interfere with locking onto rails or ledges. For aggressive skating, the trade-offs of the anti-rocker setup are considered essential.

== Freestyle setup ==
Freestyle frame

The freestyle setup is another wheel configuration favored by aggressive skaters. Despite the name, it is unrelated to freestyle slalom around cones or freestyle skating on flat ground free of street obstacles. This setup features only two outer wheels, with the middle portion of the frame replaced by solid material that resembles an extended H-block, optimized for grinding.

Freestyle via juice blocks

The company Fifty-50 pioneered a convertible setup design with its Balance Frame, which could accommodate either grindwheels or juice blocks - a type of solid grind block - in the center. When juice blocks are used in place of grindwheels, they fill out the space between frame walls and effectively extend the H-block, creating a smooth and solid grinding surface. A Balance Frame configured this way transforms from an anti-rocker setup into a freestyle setup.

Freestyle frames are lighter than anti-rocker frames due to the absence of middle wheels and bearings. They also eliminate the risk of wheel bite during grinds, since no middle wheels are present to catch on surfaces. However, this setup sacrifices stability when riding on rough terrain or bashing down stairs, where the lack of middle wheels can make moving over these surfaces unpredictable.
