= SAE J2450 =

SAE J2450 Translation Quality Metric is a quality assurance metric used in the automotive industry to grade the quality of translations of service information. It was developed by Society of Automotive Engineers (SAE) to create a consistent standard to judge the quality of translation, regardless of the source or target language. The metric can be applied to either human translation or machine translation. To carry out an assessment, the analyst tallies pre-defined types of translation errors in the document then uses weighting and normalization to derive a score that can be compared across different documents.

== History ==
The SAE J2450 Translation Quality Metric was developed by the Society of Automotive Engineers (SAE) under the J2450 Task Force on a Quality Metric for Language Translation of Service Information. The task force formed in 1997 and contained representatives of General Motors, Ford and Chrysler. The first version of SAE J2450 was released in August, 2001 as a recommended practice.

At the end of 2001, a European SAE-2450-Committee was founded to fix problems in and improve the original metric. Members of this committee came from the language staffs at Volvo Trucks, Daimler-Chrysler, Audi and Volkswagen and other European translation agencies. After negotiations between the American and European car makers, J2450 became an SAE-Norm in 2005.

As of 2024, the current version of the standard is J2450_201608.

== Description ==
SAE J2450 bases quality scores on seven types of errors: wrong term, syntactic error, omission, word structure or agreement error, misspelling, punctuation error and miscellaneous error. Errors in each category can be classified as either major or minor, with a numeric score attached to each error and severity level. The composite score, which decides the translation quality of a text, is the weighted sum of the errors normalized by the number of words in the source text.

As well as introducing a unified way to compare the quality of a variety different texts and translations, the method's categorization of errors can further assist in the identification of particular problem areas. It also speeds up post-translation review processes.

== Quality benchmark ==
Since its publication, SAE J2450 Translation Quality Metric has become one of the most important measurements in judging the quality of translation in the automobile industry and has been adopted by many translation service providers and car manufacturers.
