= SAE JA1002 =

Automotive software reliability standard

Known as the "Software Reliability Program Standard", SAE JA1002 was published in January 2004 by the Society of Automotive Engineers. It is a standard that provides a framework for the management of software reliability within system reliability requirements. It is intended to serve the needs of industry organizations in meeting software product reliability objectives and can be employed as deliverables contacted between a customer and a supplier.

SAE JA1002 is based around the Software Reliability Plan and Software Reliability Case. The Software Reliability Case can be created or maintained to serve the needs of a support organization in sustaining reliability objectives and be used to supply the data needed by independent, regulatory, and/or third party certification bodies.

== Notes and references ==
- "Arguing Security - Creating Security Assurance Cases". Archived from the original on 27 September 2007. Arguing Security – Creating Security Assurance Cases

== See also ==
- "The Mission of SAE International is to advance mobility knowledge and solutions". www.sae.org. SAE Home Page
