= SAE Supermileage Competition =

Fuel efficiency competition

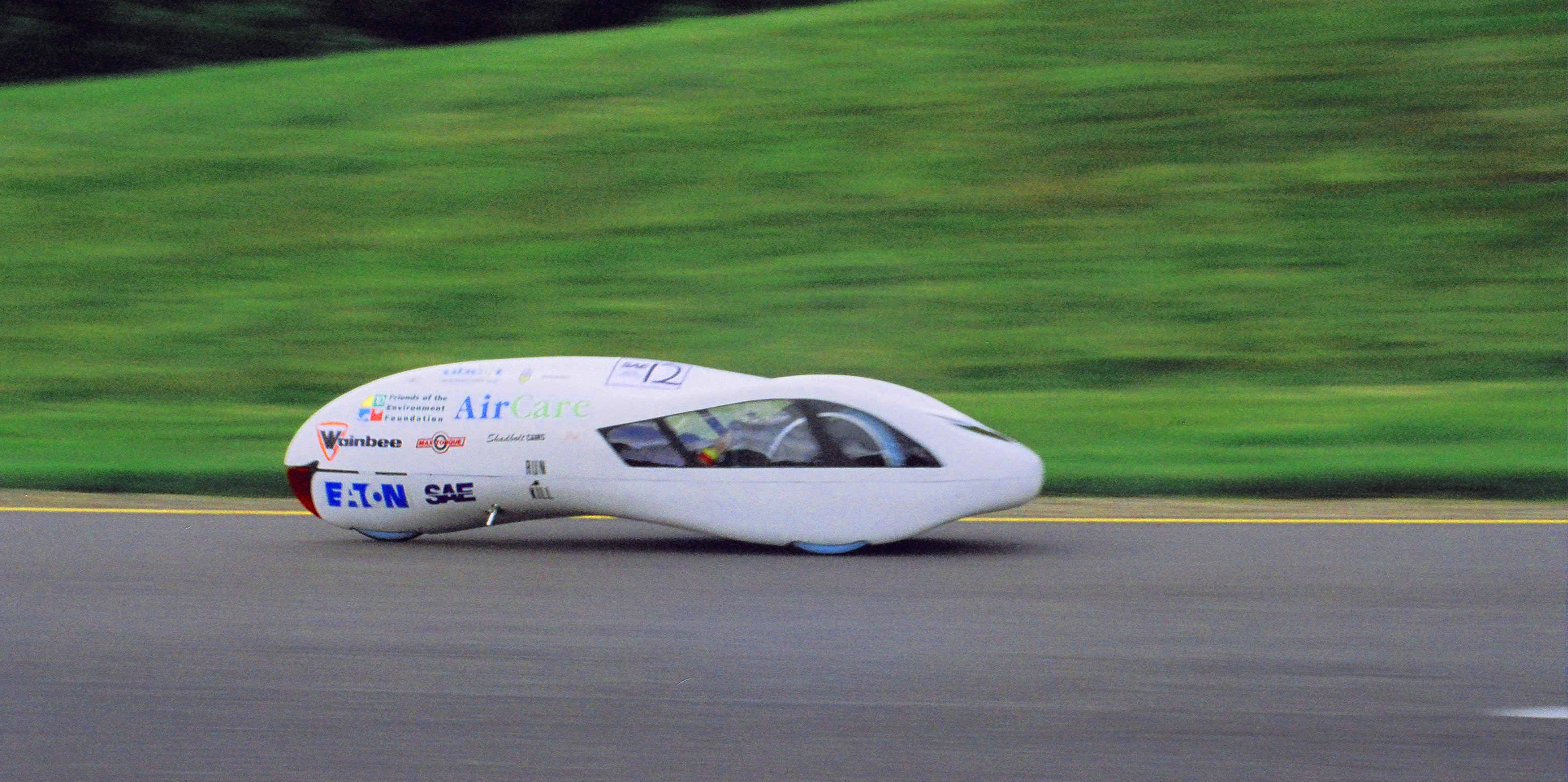
The UBC supermileage vehicle attaining cruise speed

The SAE Supermileage Competition was a yearly fuel efficiency competition held at the Eaton Corporation proving grounds located in Marshall, Michigan, United States. The Society of Automotive Engineers was the primary sponsor. Around 30 teams competed to build the vehicle that uses the least gas to go a specified distance. Teams were required to use a one cylinder lawnmower engine provided by Briggs & Stratton, but significant modification was allowed. The competition ran for almost 40 years; it was defunct as of 2023.

There were two divisions, Collegiate and High School.

In the Collegiate division, the winning team of Laval University in 2016 achieved a record setting 3,788 miles per US gallon. The winning mileage of the 2008 competition was achieved by the team from Laval University located in Quebec City, Canada, achieving 3,169 miles per US gallon (0.0742 L/100 km; 3,806 mpg_{‑imp}). In the 2010 event, Université Laval achieved the first position with 2,340 miles per US gallon (0.101 L/100 km; 2,810 mpg_{‑imp}), followed by University of Ottawa with 1,486 miles per US gallon (0.1583 L/100 km; 1,785 mpg_{‑imp}), Northern Illinois University with 1,265 miles per US gallon (0.1859 L/100 km; 1,519 mpg_{‑imp}), Rose-Hulman Institute of Technology with 1,262 miles per US gallon (0.1864 L/100 km; 1,516 mpg_{‑imp}) and École de Technologie Supérieure with 1,044 miles per US gallon (0.225 L/100 km; 1,254 mpg_{‑imp}).

In the High School division, the winning mileage of the 2008 competition was 1,716 miles per US gallon (0.1371 L/100 km; 2,061 mpg_{‑imp}), achieved by the team from Mater Dei High School of Evansville, Indiana. Mater Dei also captured first place in the 2004, 2005, 2006 and 2007 competitions in the High school division.. Since 2009, however, High School division was no longer acknowledged in the event, Collegiate Division being the only category left.

== See also ==
- Shell Eco-marathon
