= Rolling resistance =

Force resisting the motion when a body rolls on a surface

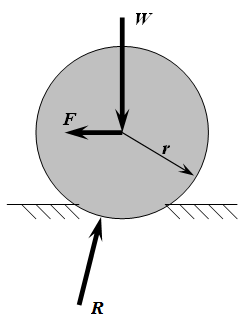
Figure 1 Hard wheel rolling on and deforming a soft surface, resulting in the reaction force R from the surface having a component that opposes the motion. (W is some vertical load on the axle, F is some towing force applied to the axle, r is the wheel radius, and both friction with the ground and friction at the axle are assumed to be negligible and so are not shown. The wheel is rolling to the left at constant speed.) Note that R is the resultant force from non-uniform pressure at the wheel-roadbed contact surface. This pressure is greater towards the front of the wheel due to hysteresis.

In physics, the rolling resistance, rolling friction or rolling drag is the force resisting the motion when a body (such as a ball, tire, or wheel) rolls on a surface. It is mainly caused by non-elastic effects; that is, not all the energy needed for deformation (or movement) of the wheel, roadbed, etc., is recovered when the pressure is removed. Two forms of this are hysteresis losses (see below), and permanent (plastic) deformation of the object or the surface (e.g. soil). Note that the slippage between the wheel and the surface also results in energy dissipation. Although some researchers have included this term in rolling resistance, some suggest that this dissipation term should be treated separately from rolling resistance because it is due to the applied torque to the wheel and the resultant slip between the wheel and ground, which is called slip loss or slip resistance. In addition, only the so-called slip resistance involves friction, therefore the name "rolling friction" is to an extent a misnomer.

Analogous with sliding friction, rolling resistance is often expressed as a coefficient times the normal force. This coefficient of rolling resistance is generally much smaller than the coefficient of sliding friction.

Any coasting wheeled vehicle will gradually slow down due to rolling resistance including that of the bearings, but a train car with steel wheels running on steel rails will roll farther than a bus of the same mass with rubber tires running on tarmac/asphalt. Factors that contribute to rolling resistance are the (amount of) deformation of the wheels, the deformation of the roadbed surface, and movement below the surface. Additional contributing factors include wheel diameter, load on wheel, surface adhesion, sliding, and relative micro-sliding between the surfaces of contact. The losses due to hysteresis also depend strongly on the material properties of the wheel or tire and the surface. For example, a rubber tire will have higher rolling resistance on a paved road than a steel railroad wheel on a steel rail. Also, sand on the ground will give more rolling resistance than concrete. Soil rolling resistance factor is not dependent on speed.

== Primary cause ==
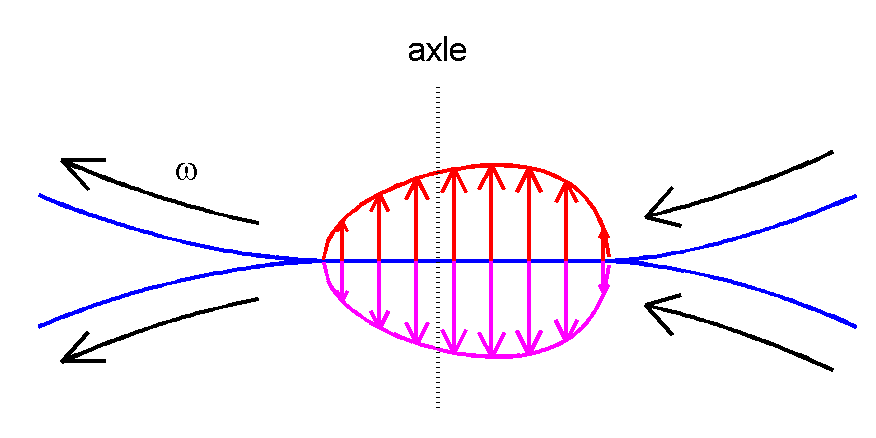
Asymmetrical pressure distribution between rolling cylinders due to viscoelastic material behavior (rolling to the right).

The primary cause of pneumatic tire rolling resistance is hysteresis:

A characteristic of a deformable material such that the energy of deformation is greater than the energy of recovery. The rubber compound in a tire exhibits hysteresis. As the tire rotates under the weight of the vehicle, it experiences repeated cycles of deformation and recovery, and it dissipates the hysteresis energy loss as heat. Hysteresis is the main cause of energy loss associated with rolling resistance and is attributed to the viscoelastic characteristics of the rubber.

— National Academy of Sciences

This main principle is illustrated in the figure of the rolling cylinders. If two equal cylinders are pressed together then the contact surface is flat. In the absence of surface friction, contact stresses are normal (i.e. perpendicular) to the contact surface. Consider a particle that enters the contact area at the right side, travels through the contact patch and leaves at the left side. Initially its vertical deformation is increasing, which is resisted by the hysteresis effect. Therefore, an additional pressure is generated to avoid interpenetration of the two surfaces. Later its vertical deformation is decreasing. This is again resisted by the hysteresis effect. In this case this decreases the pressure that is needed to keep the two bodies separate.

The resulting pressure distribution is asymmetrical and is shifted to the right. The line of action of the (aggregate) vertical force no longer passes through the centers of the cylinders. This means that a moment occurs that tends to retard the rolling motion.

Materials that have a large hysteresis effect, such as rubber, which bounce back slowly, exhibit more rolling resistance than materials with a small hysteresis effect that bounce back more quickly and more completely, such as steel or silica. Low rolling resistance tires typically incorporate silica in place of carbon black in their tread compounds to reduce low-frequency hysteresis without compromising traction. Note that railroads also have hysteresis in the roadbed structure.

== Definitions ==
In the broad sense, specific "rolling resistance" (for vehicles) is the force per unit vehicle weight required to move the vehicle on level ground at a constant slow speed where aerodynamic drag (air resistance) is insignificant and also where there are no traction (motor) forces or brakes applied. In other words, the vehicle would be coasting if it were not for the force to maintain constant speed. This broad sense includes wheel bearing resistance, the energy dissipated by vibration and oscillation of both the roadbed and the vehicle, and sliding of the wheel on the roadbed surface (pavement or a rail).

But there is an even broader sense that would include energy wasted by wheel slippage due to the torque applied from the engine. This includes the increased power required due to the increased velocity of the wheels where the tangential velocity of the driving wheel(s) becomes greater than the vehicle speed due to slippage. Since power is equal to force times velocity and the wheel velocity has increased, the power required has increased accordingly.

The pure "rolling resistance" for a train is that which happens due to deformation and possible minor sliding at the wheel-road contact. For a rubber tire, an analogous energy loss happens over the entire tire, but it is still called "rolling resistance". In the broad sense, "rolling resistance" includes wheel bearing resistance, energy loss by shaking both the roadbed (and the earth underneath) and the vehicle itself, and by sliding of the wheel, road/rail contact. Railroad textbooks seem to cover all these resistance forces but do not call their sum "rolling resistance" (broad sense) as is done in this article. They just sum up all the resistance forces (including aerodynamic drag) and call the sum basic train resistance (or the like).

Since railroad rolling resistance in the broad sense may be a few times larger than just the pure rolling resistance reported values may be in serious conflict since they may be based on different definitions of "rolling resistance". The train's engines must, of course, provide the energy to overcome this broad-sense rolling resistance.

For tires, rolling resistance is defined as the energy consumed by a tire per unit distance covered. It is also called rolling friction or rolling drag. It is one of the forces that act to oppose the motion of a driver. The main reason for this is that when the tires are in motion and touch the surface, the surface changes shape and causes deformation of the tire.

For highway motor vehicles, there is some energy dissipated in shaking the roadway (and the earth beneath it), the shaking of the vehicle itself, and the sliding of the tires. But, other than the additional power required due to torque and wheel bearing friction, non-pure rolling resistance doesn't seem to have been investigated, possibly because the "pure" rolling resistance of a rubber tire is several times higher than the neglected resistances.

== Rolling resistance coefficient ==
The "rolling resistance coefficient" is defined by the following equation:
$$\ F = C_{rr} N$$
where

- $F$ is the rolling resistance force (shown as $R$ in figure 1),
- $C_{rr}$ is the dimensionless rolling resistance coefficient or coefficient of rolling friction (CRF), and
- $N$ is the normal force, the force perpendicular to the surface on which the wheel is rolling.

$C_{rr}$ is the force needed to push (or tow) a wheeled vehicle forward (at constant speed on a level surface, or zero grade, with zero air resistance) per unit force of weight. It is assumed that all wheels are the same and bear identical weight. Thus: $\ C_{rr} = 0.01$ means that it would only take 0.01 pounds to tow a vehicle weighing one pound. For a 1000-pound vehicle, it would take 1000 times more tow force, i.e. 10 pounds. One could say that $C_{rr}$ is in lb(tow-force)/lb(vehicle weight). Since this lb/lb is force divided by force, $C_{rr}$ is dimensionless. Multiply it by 100 and you get the percent (%) of the weight of the vehicle required to maintain slow steady speed. $C_{rr}$ is often multiplied by 1000 to get the parts per thousand, which is the same as kilograms (kg force) per metric ton (tonne = 1000 kg ), which is the same as pounds of resistance per 1000 pounds of load or Newtons/kilo-Newton, etc. For the US railroads, lb/ton has been traditionally used; this is just $2000 C_{rr}$. Thus, they are all just measures of resistance per unit vehicle weight. While they are all "specific resistances", sometimes they are just called "resistance" although they are really a coefficient (ratio)or a multiple thereof. If using pounds or kilograms as force units, mass is equal to weight (in earth's gravity a kilogram a mass weighs a kilogram and exerts a kilogram of force) so one could claim that $C_{rr}$ is also the force per unit mass in such units. The SI system would use N/tonne (N/T, N/t), which is $1000 g C_{rr}$ and is force per unit mass, where g is the acceleration of gravity in SI units (meters per second square).

The above shows resistance proportional to $C_{rr}$ but does not explicitly show any variation with speed, loads, torque, surface roughness, diameter, tire inflation/wear, etc., because $C_{rr}$ itself varies with those factors. It might seem from the above definition of $C_{rr}$ that the rolling resistance is directly proportional to vehicle weight but it is not.

== Measurement ==
There are at least two popular models for calculating rolling resistance.

1. "Rolling resistance coefficient (RRC). The value of the rolling resistance force divided by the wheel load. The Society of Automotive Engineers (SAE) has developed test practices to measure the RRC of tires. These tests (SAE J1269 and SAE J2452) are usually performed on new tires. When measured by using these standard test practices, most new passenger tires have reported RRCs ranging from 0.007 to 0.014." In the case of bicycle tires, values of 0.0025 to 0.005 are achieved. These coefficients are measured on rollers, with power meters on road surfaces, or with coast-down tests. In the latter two cases, the effect of air resistance must be subtracted or the tests performed at very low speeds.
2. The coefficient of rolling resistance b, which has the dimension of length, is approximately (due to the small-angle approximation of $\cos(\theta) = 1$) equal to the value of the rolling resistance force times the radius of the wheel divided by the wheel load.
3. ISO 18164:2005 is used to test rolling resistance in Europe.

The results of these tests can be hard for the general public to obtain as manufacturers prefer to publicize "comfort" and "performance".

== Physical formulae ==
The coefficient of rolling resistance for a slow rigid wheel on a perfectly elastic surface, not adjusted for velocity, can be calculated by
$$C_{rr} = \sqrt {z/d}$$
where

- $z$ is the sinkage depth
- $d$ is the diameter of the rigid wheel

The empirical formula for $C_{rr}$ for cast iron mine car wheels on steel rails is:
$$C_{rr} = 0.0048 (18/D)^{\frac{1}{2}}(100/W)^{\frac{1}{4}} = \frac{0.0643988}{\sqrt[4]{WD^{2}}}$$
where

- $D$ is the wheel diameter in inches
- $W$ is the load on the wheel in pounds-force

As an alternative to using $C_{rr}$ one can use $b$, which is a different rolling resistance coefficient or coefficient of rolling friction with dimension of length. It is defined by the following formula:
$$F = \frac{N b}{r}$$
where

- $F$ is the rolling resistance force (shown in figure 1),
- $r$ is the wheel radius,
- $b$ is the rolling resistance coefficient or coefficient of rolling friction with dimension of length, and
- $N$ is the normal force (equal to W, not R, as shown in figure 1).

The above equation, where resistance is inversely proportional to radius $r$ seems to be based on the discredited "Coulomb's law" (Neither Coulomb's inverse square law nor Coulomb's law of friction). See dependence on diameter. Equating this equation with the force per the rolling resistance coefficient, and solving for $b$, gives $b$ = $C_{rr}r$. Therefore, if a source gives rolling resistance coefficient ($C_{rr}$) as a dimensionless coefficient, it can be converted to $b$, having units of length, by multiplying $C_{rr}$ by wheel radius $r$.

== Rolling resistance coefficient examples ==
Table of rolling resistance coefficient examples:

C_{rr}	b	Description
0.0003 to 0.0004		"Pure rolling resistance" Railroad steel wheel on steel rail
0.0010 to 0.0015	0.1 mm	Hardened steel ball bearings on steel
0.0010 to 0.0025		Special Michelin solar car/eco-marathon tires
0.0010 to 0.0024	0.5 mm	Railroad steel wheel on steel rail. Passenger rail car about 0.0020
0.0019 to 0.0065		Mine car cast iron wheels on steel rail
0.0022 to 0.0050		Production bicycle tires at 120 psi (8.3 bar) and 50 km/h (31 mph), measured on rollers
0.0050		Dirty tram rails (standard) with straights and curves
0.0045 to 0.0080		Large truck (Semi) tires
0.0055		Typical BMX bicycle tires used for solar cars
0.0065		EU passenger car tyre label fuel efficiency class A (upper limit)
0.0062 to 0.0150		Car tire measurements
0.0100 to 0.0150		Ordinary car tires on concrete
0.0385 to 0.0730		Stage coach (19th century) on dirt road. Soft snow on road for worst case.
0.3000		Ordinary car tires on sand

For example, in earth gravity, a car of 1000 kg on asphalt will need a force of around 100 newtons for rolling (1000 kg × 9.81 m/s^{2} × 0.01 = 98.1 N).

== Dependence on diameter ==
=== Stagecoaches and railroads ===
According to Dupuit (1837), rolling resistance (of wheeled carriages with wooden wheels with iron tires) is approximately inversely proportional to the square root of wheel diameter. This rule has been experimentally verified for cast iron wheels (8″ - 24″ diameter) on steel rail and for 19th century carriage wheels. But there are other tests on carriage wheels that do not agree. Theory of a cylinder rolling on an elastic roadway also gives this same rule These contradict earlier (1785) tests by Coulomb of rolling wooden cylinders where Coulomb reported that rolling resistance was inversely proportional to the diameter of the wheel (known as "Coulomb's law"). This disputed (or wrongly applied) -"Coulomb's law" is still found in handbooks, however.

=== Pneumatic tires ===
For pneumatic tires on hard pavement, it is reported that the effect of diameter on rolling resistance is negligible (within a practical range of diameters).

== Dependence on applied torque ==
The driving torque $T$ to overcome rolling resistance $R_{r}$ and maintain steady speed on level ground (with no air resistance) can be calculated by:
$$T = \frac{V_{s}}{\Omega} R_r$$
where

- $V_s$ is the linear speed of the body (at the axle), and
- $\Omega$ its rotational speed.

It is noteworthy that $V_{s} / \Omega$ is usually not equal to the radius of the rolling body as a result of wheel slip. The slip between wheel and ground inevitably occurs whenever a driving or braking torque is applied to the wheel. Consequently, the linear speed of the vehicle differs from the wheel's circumferential speed. It is notable that slip does not occur in driven wheels, which are not subjected to driving torque, under different conditions except braking. Therefore, rolling resistance, namely hysteresis loss, is the main source of energy dissipation in driven wheels or axles, whereas in the drive wheels and axles slip resistance, namely loss due to wheel slip, plays the role as well as rolling resistance. Significance of rolling or slip resistance is largely dependent on the tractive force, coefficient of friction, normal load, etc.

=== All wheels ===
"Applied torque" may either be driving torque applied by a motor (often through a transmission) or a braking torque applied by brakes (including regenerative braking). Such torques results in energy dissipation (above that due to the basic rolling resistance of a freely rolling, i.e. except slip resistance). This additional loss is in part due to the fact that there is some slipping of the wheel, and for pneumatic tires, there is more flexing of the sidewalls due to the torque. Slip is defined such that a 2% slip means that the circumferential speed of the driving wheel exceeds the speed of the vehicle by 2%.

A small percentage slip can result in a slip resistance which is much larger than the basic rolling resistance. For example, for pneumatic tires, a 5% slip can translate into a 200% increase in rolling resistance. This is partly because the tractive force applied during this slip is many times greater than the rolling resistance force and thus much more power per unit velocity is being applied (recall power = force x velocity so that power per unit of velocity is just force). So just a small percentage increase in circumferential velocity due to slip can translate into a loss of traction power which may even exceed the power loss due to basic (ordinary) rolling resistance. For railroads, this effect may be even more pronounced due to the low rolling resistance of steel wheels.

It is shown that for a passenger car, when the tractive force is about 40% of the maximum traction, the slip resistance is almost equal to the basic rolling resistance (hysteresis loss). But in case of a tractive force equal to 70% of the maximum traction, slip resistance becomes 10 times larger than the basic rolling resistance.

=== Railroad steel wheels ===
In order to apply any traction to the wheels, some slippage of the wheel is required. For trains climbing up a grade, this slip is normally 1.5% to 2.5%.

Slip (also known as creep) is normally roughly directly proportional to tractive effort. An exception is if the tractive effort is so high that the wheel is close to substantial slipping (more than just a few percent as discussed above), then slip rapidly increases with tractive effort and is no longer linear. With a little higher applied tractive effort the wheel spins out of control and the adhesion drops resulting in the wheel spinning even faster. This is the type of slipping that is observable by eye—the slip of say 2% for traction is only observed by instruments. Such rapid slip may result in excessive wear or damage.

=== Pneumatic tires ===
Rolling resistance greatly increases with applied torque. At high torques, which apply a tangential force to the road of about half the weight of the vehicle, the rolling resistance may triple (a 200% increase). This is in part due to a slip of about 5%. The rolling resistance increase with applied torque is not linear, but increases at a faster rate as the torque becomes higher.

== Dependence on wheel load ==
=== Railroad steel wheels ===
The rolling resistance coefficient, Crr, significantly decreases as the weight of the rail car per wheel increases. For example, an empty freight car had about twice the Crr as a loaded car (Crr=0.002 vs. Crr=0.001). This same "economy of scale" shows up in testing of mine rail cars. The theoretical Crr for a rigid wheel rolling on an elastic roadbed shows Crr inversely proportional to the square root of the load.

If Crr is itself dependent on wheel load per an inverse square-root rule, then for an increase in load of 2% only a 1% increase in rolling resistance occurs.

=== Pneumatic tires ===
For pneumatic tires, the direction of change in Crr (rolling resistance coefficient) depends on whether or not tire inflation is increased with increasing load. It is reported that, if inflation pressure is increased with load according to an (undefined) "schedule", then a 20% increase in load decreases Crr by 3%. But, if the inflation pressure is not changed, then a 20% increase in load results in a 4% increase in Crr. Of course, this will increase the rolling resistance by 20% due to the increase in load plus 1.2 x 4% due to the increase in Crr resulting in a 24.8% increase in rolling resistance.

== Dependence on curvature of roadway ==
=== General ===
When a vehicle (motor vehicle or railroad train) goes around a curve, rolling resistance usually increases. If the curve is not banked so as to exactly counter the centrifugal force with an equal and opposing centripetal force due to the banking, then there will be a net unbalanced sideways force on the vehicle. This will result in increased rolling resistance. Banking is also known as "superelevation" or "cant" (not to be confused with rail cant of a rail). For railroads, this is called curve resistance but for roads it has (at least once) been called rolling resistance due to cornering.

== Sound ==
Rolling friction generates sound (vibrational) energy, as mechanical energy is converted to this form of energy due to the friction. One of the most common examples of rolling friction is the movement of motor vehicle tires on a roadway, a process which generates sound as a by-product. The sound generated by automobile and truck tires as they roll (especially noticeable at highway speeds) is mostly due to the percussion of the tire treads, and compression (and subsequent decompression) of air temporarily captured within the treads.

== Factors that contribute in tires ==
Several factors affect the magnitude of rolling resistance a tire generates:

- As mentioned in the introduction: wheel radius, forward speed, surface adhesion, and relative micro-sliding.
- Material - different fillers and polymers in tire composition can improve traction while reducing hysteresis. The replacement of some carbon black with higher-priced silica–silane is one common way of reducing rolling resistance. The use of exotic materials including nano-clay has been shown to reduce rolling resistance in high performance rubber tires. Solvents may also be used to swell solid tires, decreasing the rolling resistance.
- Dimensions - rolling resistance in tires is related to the flex of sidewalls and the contact area of the tire For example, at the same pressure, wider bicycle tires flex less in the sidewalls as they roll and thus have lower rolling resistance (although higher air resistance).
- Extent of inflation - Lower pressure in tires results in more flexing of the sidewalls and higher rolling resistance. This energy conversion in the sidewalls increases resistance and can also lead to overheating and may have played a part in the infamous Ford Explorer rollover accidents.
- Over inflating tires (such a bicycle tires) may not lower the overall rolling resistance as the tire may skip and hop over the road surface. Traction is sacrificed, and overall rolling friction may not be reduced as the wheel rotational speed changes and slippage increases.
- Sidewall deflection is not a direct measurement of rolling friction. A high quality tire with a high quality (and supple) casing will allow for more flex per energy loss than a cheap tire with a stiff sidewall. Again, on a bicycle, a quality tire with a supple casing will still roll easier than a cheap tire with a stiff casing. Similarly, as noted by Goodyear truck tires, a tire with a "fuel saving" casing will benefit the fuel economy through many tread lives (i.e. retreading), while a tire with a "fuel saving" tread design will only benefit until the tread wears down.
- In tires, tread thickness and shape has much to do with rolling resistance. The thicker and more contoured the tread, the higher the rolling resistance Thus, the "fastest" bicycle tires have very little tread and heavy duty trucks get the best fuel economy as the tire tread wears out.
- Diameter effects seem to be negligible, provided the pavement is hard and the range of diameters is limited. See dependence on diameter.
- Virtually all world speed records have been set on relatively narrow wheels, probably because of their aerodynamic advantage at high speed, which is much less important at normal speeds.
- Temperature: with both solid and pneumatic tires, rolling resistance has been found to decrease as temperature increases (within a range of temperatures: i.e. there is an upper limit to this effect) For a rise in temperature from 30 °C to 70 °C the rolling resistance decreased by 20-25%. Racers heat their tires before racing, but this is primarily used to increase tire friction rather than to decrease rolling resistance.

== Railroads: Components of rolling resistance ==
In a broad sense rolling resistance can be defined as the sum of components):

1. Wheel bearing torque losses.
2. Pure rolling resistance.
3. Sliding of the wheel on the rail.
4. Loss of energy to the roadbed (and earth).
5. Loss of energy to oscillation of railway rolling stock.

Wheel bearing torque losses can be measured as a rolling resistance at the wheel rim, Crr. Railroads normally use roller bearings which are either cylindrical (Russia) or tapered (United States). The specific rolling resistance in bearings varies with both wheel loading and speed. Wheel bearing rolling resistance is lowest with high axle loads and intermediate speeds of 60–80 km/h with a Crr of 0.00013 (axle load of 21 tonnes). For empty freight cars with axle loads of 5.5 tonnes, Crr goes up to 0.00020 at 60 km/h but at a low speed of 20 km/h it increases to 0.00024 and at a high speed (for freight trains) of 120 km/h it is 0.00028. The Crr obtained above is added to the Crr of the other components to obtain the total Crr for the wheels.

== Comparing rolling resistance of highway vehicles and trains ==
The rolling resistance of steel wheels on steel rail of a train is far less than that of the rubber tires wheels of an automobile or truck. The weight of trains varies greatly; in some cases they may be much heavier per passenger or per net ton of freight than an automobile or truck, but in other cases they may be much lighter.

As an example of a very heavy passenger train, in 1975, Amtrak passenger trains weighed a little over 7 tonnes per passenger, which is much heavier than an average of a little over one ton per passenger for an automobile. This means that for an Amtrak passenger train in 1975, much of the energy savings of the lower rolling resistance was lost to its greater weight.

An example of a very light high-speed passenger train is the N700 Series Shinkansen, which weighs 715 tonnes and carries 1323 passengers, resulting in a per-passenger weight of about half a tonne. This lighter weight per passenger, combined with the lower rolling resistance of steel wheels on steel rail means that an N700 Shinkansen is much more energy efficient than a typical automobile.

In the case of freight, CSX ran an advertisement campaign in 2013 claiming that their freight trains move "a ton of freight 436 miles on a gallon of fuel", whereas some sources claim trucks move a ton of freight about 130 miles per gallon of fuel, indicating trains are more efficient overall.

== See also ==
- Coefficient of friction
- Low-rolling resistance tires
- Maglev (Magnetic Levitation, the elimination of rolling and thus rolling resistance)
- Rolling element bearing
