= SAE J2452 =

SAE J1269 and SAE J2452 performed on new tires

SAE J2452 is a standard defined by the Society of Automotive Engineers to measure the rolling resistance of tires. Where the older standard, SAE J1269, produces measurements of rolling resistance under steady-state (i.e. thermally equilibrated) operating conditions, SAE J2452 produces measurements during a transient history of speed that is intended to mimic a vehicle coastdown event. During the SAE J2452 test, the tire is not in thermal equilibrium, but the coastdown event is rapid enough that the tire operates at a roughly iso-thermal condition.

Either procedure may be used to investigate the effects of different vehicle loads (weight), tire pressures and vehicle speeds.

The rolling resistance coefficient (RRC) indicates the amount of force required to overcome the hysteresis of the material as the tire rolls. Tire pressure, vehicle weight and velocity all play a role in how much force is lost to rolling resistance.

The basic model equation for SAE J2452 is:

Rolling Resistance (N / Lbs) = P^{α} Z^{β} (a + bV + cV^{2})

where:

P is the tire inflation pressure (kPa / psi)
Z is the applied load for vehicle weight (N / Lbs)
V is the vehicle speed (km/h / mph)
alpha, beta, a, b, c are the coefficients for the model.

The units of the coefficients are matched to the units used in the model (i.e. metric/Imperial).
