= SAE J1269 =

Standard test of tire rolling resistance

- Rolling Resistance Measurement Procedure for Passenger Car, Light Truck, and Highway Truck and Bus Tires
- SAE J1269 and SAE J2452 performed on new tires.
- Status: Published
- Year started: 1979
- Latest version: 202012; December 22, 2020
- Organization: SAE International
- Committee: Highway Tire Committee
- Related standards: SAE J2452, ISO 28580

SAE J1269 is a standard test defined by the Society of Automotive Engineers to measure the rolling resistance of tires under conditions of thermal equilibrium. SAE J2452 is an alternative procedure for measuring rolling resistance under conditions similar to a vehicle coastdown event, where the tire is in a roughly isothermal condition (but not thermal equilibrium).

The rolling resistance coefficient (RRC) thus measured indicates the proportion of energy that is lost to the hysteresis of the material as the tire rolls.
