= SAE International =

Professional association and standards organization for transport and other industries

- Type: Professional organization
- Industry: Automotive, automobile, aerospace, commercial vehicle
- Founded: 1905; 121 years ago
- Headquarters: Warrendale, Pennsylvania
- Number of locations: 7
- Area served: Worldwide
- Key people: Andrew L. Riker; Henry Ford; Thomas Edison; Glenn Martin; Orville Wright; Charles Kettering
- Products: Industry standards, membership, conferences, publications, professional development
- Members: 138,000
- Website: www.sae.org

SAE International is a global professional association and standards organization based in Warrendale, Pennsylvania, United States. Formerly the Society of Automotive Engineers, the organization adopted its current name in 2006 to reflect both its international membership and the increased scope of its activities beyond automotive engineering and the automotive industry to include aerospace and other transport industries, as well as commercial vehicles including autonomous vehicles such as self-driving cars, trucks, surface vessels, drones, and related technologies.

SAE International has over 138,000 global members. Membership is granted to individuals, rather than companies. Aside from its standardization efforts, SAE International also devotes resources to projects and programs in STEM education, professional certification, and collegiate design competitions.

== History ==
In the early 1900s there were dozens of automobile manufacturers in the United States, and many more worldwide. Auto manufacturers and parts companies joined trade groups that promoted business. A desire to solve common technical design problems and develop engineering standards was emerging. Engineers in the automobile business expressed a desire to have "free exchange of ideas" to expand their technical knowledge base.

Two magazine publishers, Peter Heldt of The Horseless Age, and Horace Swetland of The Automobile, were advocates of the concepts for SAE. Heldt wrote an editorial in June 1902 in which he said, "Now there is a noticeable tendency for automobile manufacturers to follow certain accepted lines of construction, technical questions constantly arise which seek a solution from the cooperation of the technical men connected with the industry. These questions could best be dealt with by a technical society. The field of activity for this society would be the purely technical side of automobiles."

Horace Swetland wrote on automotive engineering concerns and became an original SAE officer. About two years after Heldt's editorial, the Society of Automobile Engineers was founded in New York City. Four officers and five managing officers volunteered. In 1905 Andrew L. Riker served as president, and Henry Ford served as the society's first vice president. The initial membership was engineers with annual dues of US$10.

Over the first 10 years, SAE membership grew steadily, and the society added full-time staff and began to publish a technical journal and a comprehensive compilation of technical papers, previously called SAE Transactions, which still exist today in the form of SAE International's Journals. By 1916 SAE had 1,800 members. At the annual meeting that year, representatives from the American Society of Aeronautic Engineers, the Society of Tractor Engineers, as well as representatives from the power boating industry made a pitch to SAE for oversight of technical standards in their industries. Aeronautics was a fledgling industry at that time. Early supporters of the concept of a society to represent aeronautical engineers were Thomas Edison, Glenn Curtiss, Glenn Martin, and Orville Wright.

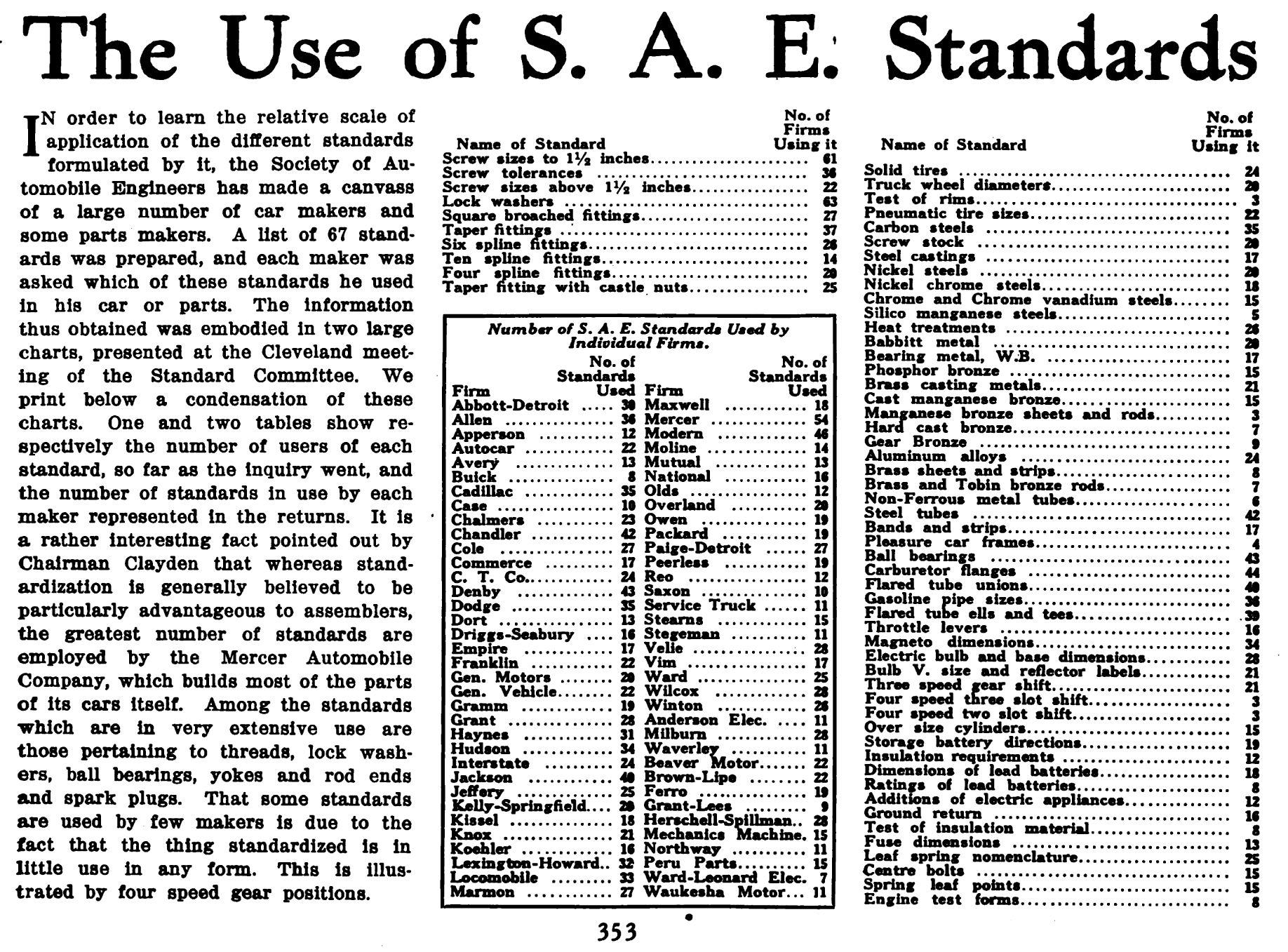
Survey results on the adoption rate of SAE standards among various manufacturers, reported in the journal Horseless Age, 1916

Out of the meeting in 1916 came a new organization, to represent engineers in all types of mobility-related professions. SAE member Elmer Sperry created the term "automotive" from Greek autos (self), and Latin motivus (of motion) origins to represent any form of self-powered vehicle. The Society of Automobile Engineers became the Society of Automotive Engineers.

Women joined the SAE in the 1920's, with Marie Luhring becoming an associate member of the organization in 1920. Ethel H. Bailey became the first woman to become a full member of the SAE in 1926, having joined the staff as a research engineer in 1920.

Charles Kettering presided over SAE during World War I and saw membership pass the 5,000 mark. During this time, SAE emphasized the importance of developing member activity through local chapters – called Sections. After World War II, the Society established links with other standards bodies and automotive engineering societies worldwide, and since then has founded sections in countries including Brazil, India, China, Russia, Romania, and Egypt. By 1980, membership surpassed 35,000 and over the next two decades the society, like the industries and individuals it serves, became larger, more global, more diverse, and more electronic.

By the mid-1980s, membership edged close to 50,000; by the end of the 1990s, membership topped 80,000 with members in more than 80 countries.

As of 2017, the society serves over 138,000 global members, with more than a quarter from outside of North America.

== Timeline ==
Date	Event
	1900s
1904	Edward Tracy Birdsall, charter member of the American Institute of Electrical Engineers, invites others to the Automobile Club of America at 753 5th Ave., New York, NY to organize a society of engineers concerned with all aspects of automobiles. Those invited included Horace Swetland, publisher of the trade journal The Automobile, and seven others. Henry Ford, though invited, did not attend.
1905	30 founding members of the society of automobile engineers meet in New York to elect officers. They were: President: Andrew L. Riker, engine designer for Locomobile First Vice President: Henry Ford Second Vice President: John Wilkinson, engine designer for the Franklin automobile Secretary-treasurer: Edward Birdsall SAE Council: Horace Swetland, The Automobile Allen H Whiting, New York manufacturer of The Whiting auto Hiram P Maxim, The Electric Vehicle Company H W Alden, The Electric Vehicle Company LT Gibbs H Vanderbeek – Source:
1906	Membership listed at 52; 32 attend meeting from nine different states. Volume 1, no. 0, of SAE Transactions printed with three papers.
1907	Membership listed at 100.
1908	Membership listed at 150.
1909	Society is incorporated, debut of original SAE logo. Membership approaches 400.
	1910s
1911	SAE is formally incorporated in New York. The Association of Licensed Automobile Manufacturers effectively dissolves following court ruling. SAE takes over ALAM's technical section, beginning SAE's standardization program. SAE opens associate membership to anyone "in a responsible commercial or financial capacity." The SAE Bulletin is founded.
1912	SAE publishes its first standard. ALAM officially dissolves.
1913	Membership exceeds 1700.
1914	Initial publication of SAE's annual compilation of standards in the SAE Data Book.
1915	SAE moves headquarters to the Engineering Societies' Building. SAE standardization efforts reduces the different types of lock washers used in vehicles by 90% (originally 300), reduced 1600 sizes of seamless steel tubing to 221. First student branch is formed at Cornell University.
1916	SAE opens a Detroit office. Admits members of the American Society of Aeronautical Engineers, the Society of Tractor Engineers, National Association of Engine and Boat Manufacturers, the National Gas Engine Association, and the American Society of Agricultural Engineers. The National Gas Engine Association and the National Association of Engine and Boat Manufacturers merge their standards work with SAE. SAE publishes first aeronautical standard.
1917	Elmer Sperry coins the word automotive; SAE changes its name to Society of Automotive Engineers in February. National Automobile Chamber of Commerce begins to support standards work. Found Washington DC Office in the Munsey Trust Building. Cooperated with the Quartermaster Corps to produce the liberty truck and with the U.S. Navy department and the Signal Corps to produce the Liberty airplane engine, the Liberty L-12. SAE's Journal is founded.
1918	Orville Wright writes to Charles Witteman of the Witteman – Lewis Aircraft Company. It begins: "My dear Mr. Witteman: as your name does not appear on the roster of the Society of automotive engineers, I suspect the advantages of membership have not been presented to you. The work covered by the S.A.E. is of such value that everybody identified with the industry should take out membership."
1919	Membership exceeds 4300.
	1920s
1920	Membership reaches 5000, including SAE's first woman member Nellie M. Scott, treasurer of the Bantam Ball Bearing company of Bantam, Connecticut.
1921	SAE standards number 224. Automotive Industries estimates SAE standards save $750 million, or 15% of the retail value of all automobiles sold.
1922	Membership exceeds 5000.
1926	Membership exceeds 6000.
1927	The first SAE award is created – the Wright Brothers medal – for the best paper on the topic of aircraft.
	1930s
1930	25th Anniversary. Membership exceeds 7000.
1933	Fuels and Lubricants Meetings Committee is formed.
1935	Tractor and Industrial Power Equipment Meetings Committee is formed.
1936	SAE's first National Aircraft Production Meeting is held.
1939	The SAE War Engineering Board is established to evaluate problems defined by the military and to assign committees of specialists to ascertain prompt solutions.
	1940s
1940	Membership reaches 5855.
1942	The War Activity Council is formed to coordinate efforts for the Allied forces.
1943	The War Activity Office is established in Detroit.
1944	The Special Publication Department is formed.
1945	Membership exceeds 12,000.
1946	The Technical Board is formed, creating standards for design, manufacturing, testing, quality control, and procurement.
1947	Formal Engineering Meetings structure established. The Engineering Materials Meetings Committee is formed.
	1950s
1958	The Sections Board is formed to guide SAE's local sections and keep the SAE board of directors informed.
	1960s
1961	SAE Aerospace standards number 1000.
1966	SAE publications gain international coverage.
1967	The phrase "land, sea, air, and space" is added to the SAE logo.
	1970s
1973	SAE launches first design competition for college students called the Recreational-Ecological Vehicle contest.
1974	SAE moves headquarters to a new location on Thorn Hill in Warrendale, PA, 20 miles north of Pittsburgh, PA. Warrendale is christened SAE World Headquarters.
1976	SAE officially launches its Collegiate Design Series.
1977	The SAE Fellow award is established to recognize achievements in technology and engineering.
1978	The SAE Women Engineers Committee is formed.
	1980s
1981	The collegiate design competition Formula SAE begins. The first volume of Aerospace Engineering Magazine is published.
1983	SAE begins its Professional Development Program to educate and certify mobility engineers.
1986	SAE creates the SAE Foundation to fund and promote education in math and science.
	1990s
1990	SAE foundation launches A World in Motion, "with the specific aim of bringing a new style of pedagogy to physical sciences in grades four, five, and six." SAE establishes the Performance Review Institute, a nonprofit affiliate, to develop performance standards and certify systems accordingly. SAE forms its first international affiliation with SAE Brazil
	2000s
2002	SAE recognizes its second organizational affiliate, SAE India.
2004	The Institute of Vehicle Engineers, UK, merges with the United Kingdom's Midlands SAE Section to form SAE UK. SAE membership reaches 84,000.
2005	SAE Aerospace standards number 6200. SAE celebrates its 100-year anniversary with SAE 100.
2006	SAE officially changes its name from Society of Automotive Engineers to SAE International to better reflect its current scope: both the increasingly international scope of its activities and membership and the applicability to other industries besides the automotive industry, such as the aerospace industry.
	2010s
2010	SAE membership reaches 120,000.
2012	SAE International acquires Tech Briefs Media Group.
2014	SAE International Completes Asset Purchase of ARINC Industry Activities – Expands Aerospace Portfolio.
2019	SAE International forms Automated Vehicle Safety Consortium

== Technical standards ==
SAE International provides a forum for companies, government agencies, research institutions and consultants to devise technical standards and recommended practices for the design, construction, and characteristics of motor vehicle components. SAE documents do not carry any legal force, but are in some cases referenced by the U.S. National Highway Traffic Safety Administration (NHTSA) and Transport Canada.

=== Aerospace industry standards ===
SAE publishes technical documents for the aerospace industry. Aerospace Recommended Practices are recommendations for engineering practice, and Aerospace Information Reports contain general accepted engineering data and information.

=== Levels of autonomy ===
SAE has proposed an influential categorization for "levels of driving automation" in vehicular automation. SAE J3016 defines six levels of automation for cars, ranging from level 0 (No Driving Automation) to level 5 (Full Automation), transitioning gradually from "driver support features" to "automated driving features". This categorization scheme has also been adopted by the NHTSA.

== SAE units ==
For historical legacy reasons, the label "SAE" is commonly used on tools and hardware in North America to indicate United States customary units measurements, that is, inch-based not metric (SI). Both this usage and casual use of the term "Imperial" are loose and imprecise (but common) references to inch fractional sizes and to the screw thread sizes of the Unified Thread Standard (UTS).

=== Horsepower ratings ===
SAE has long provided standards for rating automobile horsepower. Until 1971–1972 SAE gross power was used. Similar to brake horsepower (bhp), it gave generously unrealistic performance ratings. Since then, the standard has been the more conservative SAE net power, which takes into account engine accessory, emissions, and exhaust drags, but not transmission losses.

== Publications ==
SAE International has been publishing technical information since 1906. Industry magazines published monthly include: Automotive Engineering International, Aerospace Engineering and Manufacturing, Off Highway Engineering, Truck & Bus Engineering, SAE Vehicle Engineering, e-newsletters, Momentum magazine for student members, and various journals. SAE also produces the monthly Update newsletter for its members and publishes more than 100 books a year in print and electronic formats. Ranging from compilations on various technical subjects, to textbooks, to historical and enthusiast-oriented books, SAE's titles cater to a variety of readers.

In April 2007, MIT canceled its subscription to SAE because of required digital rights management (DRM) technology implemented on SAE web-based database of technical papers. SAE International removed the DRM restrictions for colleges, universities, and other academic institutions.

== SAE Foundation ==
In 1986, SAE International established the SAE Foundation to support science and technology education. One of the most pressing issues facing industry today is the decline of students enrolling in science and technology programs. This decline and its impact threaten the ability to meet future workforce demands. The SAE Foundation encourages and supports the development of skills related to mathematics, technology, engineering and science.

=== STEM program ===
A World In Motion is a teacher-administered, industry volunteer-assisted program that brings science, technology, engineering and math (STEM) education to life in the classroom for students in Kindergarten through Grade 12. Benchmarked to the national standards, AWIM incorporates the laws of physics, motion, flight and electronics into age-appropriate hands on activities that reinforce classroom STEM curriculum.

=== SAE Collegiate Design Series ===
The SAE Collegiate Design Series provides an opportunity for college students to go beyond textbook theory and replicates the process of engineering design and manufacturing. In the CDS program, a company wants to sell a product for a specific market segment, for example a radio controlled airplane, a single seat off-road vehicle, or a single seat Formula style race car. Instead of doing all the design, manufacturing and testing in house, the customer chooses to contract out those processes to a supplier, and sends their requirements out for bid. Student teams act as the suppliers and design, build and test a prototype vehicle that they believe meets the customer's specifications. Each team then presents its prototype to the customer at the annual competitions and is judged on several criteria. The team with the highest points essentially wins the contract.

The SAE Collegiate Design Series competitions include the following:

- SAE Aero Design – a series of competitive mechanical engineering events, it is generally divided into three categories: Regular class, Advanced class and Micro class.
- Baja SAE
- SAE Clean Snowmobile Challenge
- Formula SAE
- Formula Hybrid
- SAE Supermileage
- SAE AutoDrive Challenge

== See also ==
- ARP4754 – Aerospace Practice
- ARP4761 – Aerospace recommended practice from SAE International
- Association of Licensed Automobile Manufacturers – American organization
- Battery terminal – Electrical contacts in a battery
- Electronic control unit – Automotive control system
- FISITA
- IEEE – American professional association
- SAE JA1002 – Automotive software reliability standard
- SAE J1269 – Standard test of tire rolling resistance
- SAE J1939 – Network protocol
- SAE J2450 Translation Quality Metric
- SAE J2452
- SAE steel grades – Standard alloy numbering system for steel grades
