= Sipe =

Sipe or Sipes may refer to:

- Siping (rubber), process to improve traction in slippery conditions
- Sipe, Estonia, village in Kambja Parish, Tartu County, Estonia
- Sipe Sipe, town in Bolivia
- Swimming-induced pulmonary edema

== People with the surname Sipe ==
- Brian Sipe, American football player
- Jeff Sipe, American jazz rock drummer
- Richard Sipe (1932–2018), American author
- Russell Sipe, minor-planet discoverer
- Russell Sipe, founder of Computer Gaming World magazine
- William Allen Sipe (1844–1935), American politician from Pennsylvania

== People with the surname Sipes ==
- Andrew Sipes, American director of Fair Game and other films
- Andy Sipes, American television actor
- Connie Sipes, American politician from Indiana
- Gilbert Sipes, a fictional character in the 1995 film Gordy
- Leonard Sipes or Tommy Collins (1930–2000), American country singer-songwriter

== See also ==
- Siping (disambiguation)
