= Siping =

Siping may refer to:

- Siping (rubber), process of cutting thin slits across a rubber surface

== China ==
- Siping, Jilin (四平市) formerly Sipingjie
- Siping Road Station (四平路站), in Shanghai
- Siping, Liaoning (四平镇), town in Pulandian

== See also ==
- Sipe (disambiguation)
