= Senator Grooms =

Senator Grooms may refer to:

- Larry Grooms (born 1964), South Carolina Senate
- Ron Grooms (born 1944), Indiana Carolina Senate
