= Andrea Hunley =

American politician

Member of the Indiana Senate from the 46th district
- In office November 2022 – November 4, 2026
- Preceded by: Kevin Boehnlein
- Succeeded by: Allissa Impink

Personal details
- Born: Fort Wayne, Indiana, U.S.
- Party: Democratic
- Education: Indiana University, Bloomington (BS); Indiana University, Indianapolis (MEd)

Andrea Hunley is an American politician who formerly served as a member of the Indiana Senate from the 46th District. Hunley is a former Indianapolis Public School principal. She has served as Assistant Minority Leader of the Indiana Senate since 2024. Hunley is currently running for mayor of Indianapolis, as of April 20, 2026.

== Early life and education ==
Hunley was born in Fort Wayne, Indiana. She earned a Bachelors of secondary education and teaching from Indiana University Bloomington in 2006, a master's degree in education from Indiana University-Purdue University at Indianapolis in 2010, and a bachelor's degree in education from Indiana University Bloomington in 2011.

== Career ==
Hunley worked as a K-8 public school principal with Indianapolis Public Schools, an assistant principal with Metropolitan School District of Washington Township and as a high school English teacher with the Metropolitan School District of Wayne Township.

== Electoral history ==
Democratic primary for Indiana State Senate District 46, 2022
Party	Candidate	Votes	%
Democratic	Andrea Hunley	3,142	43.9%
Democratic	Kristin Jones	1,859	25.9%
Democratic	Ashley Eason	1,194	16.7%
Democratic	Karla Lopez Owens	893	12.5%
Democratic	Bobby Kern	77	1.1%
Total votes		7,165	100.0%

Indiana State Senate District 46 general election, 2022
Party	Candidate	Votes	%
Democratic	Andrea Hunley	19,433	72.9%
Republican	Evan Shearin	7,226	27.1%
Total votes		25,659	100.0%
Democratic gain from Republican			
