= Snow chains =

Devices fitted to the tires of vehicles to improve traction on snow and ice

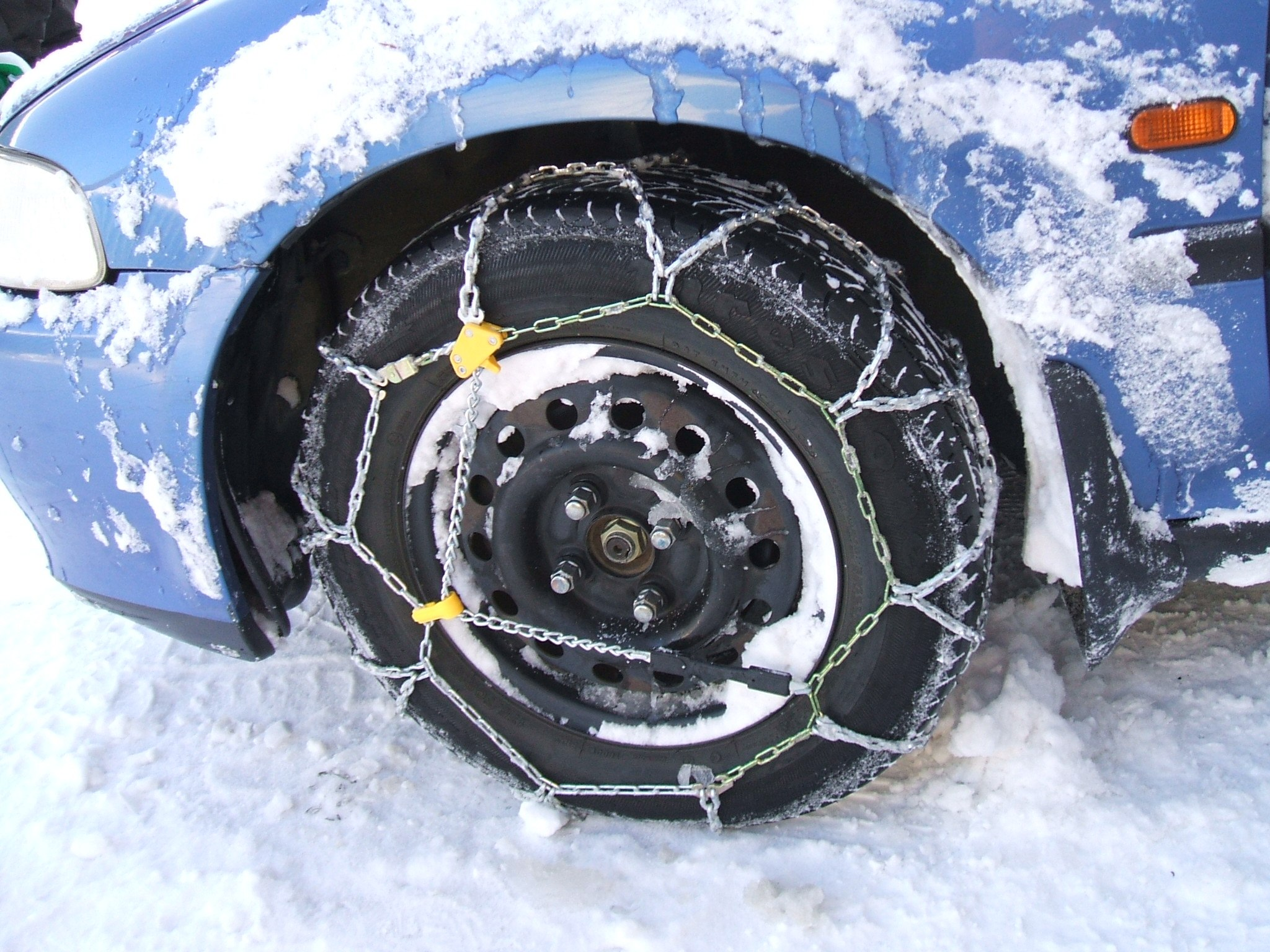
Link-type, diamond pattern snow chains on a front-wheel drive automobile

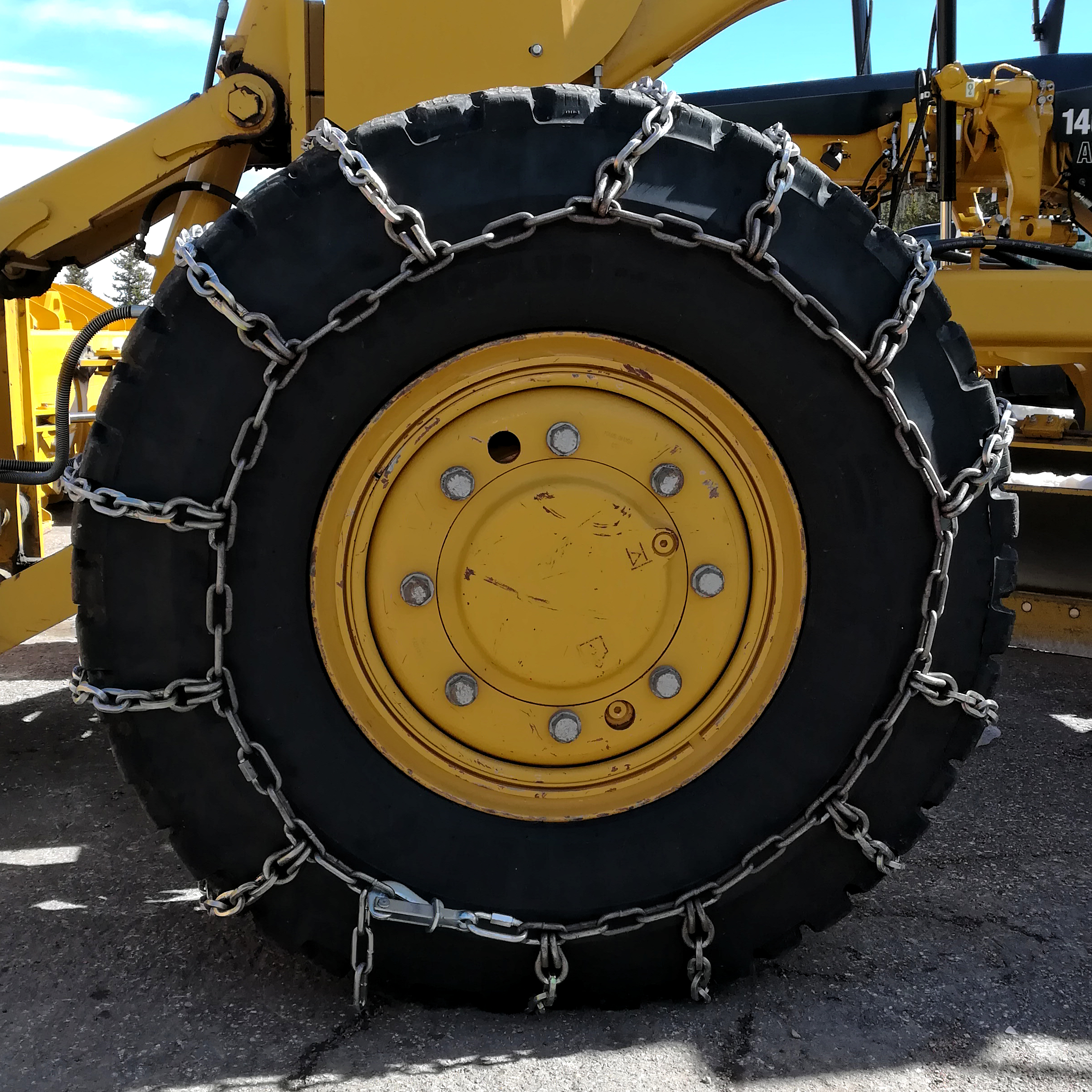
Snow chains at the front wheel of a grader at the Pikes Peak Highway

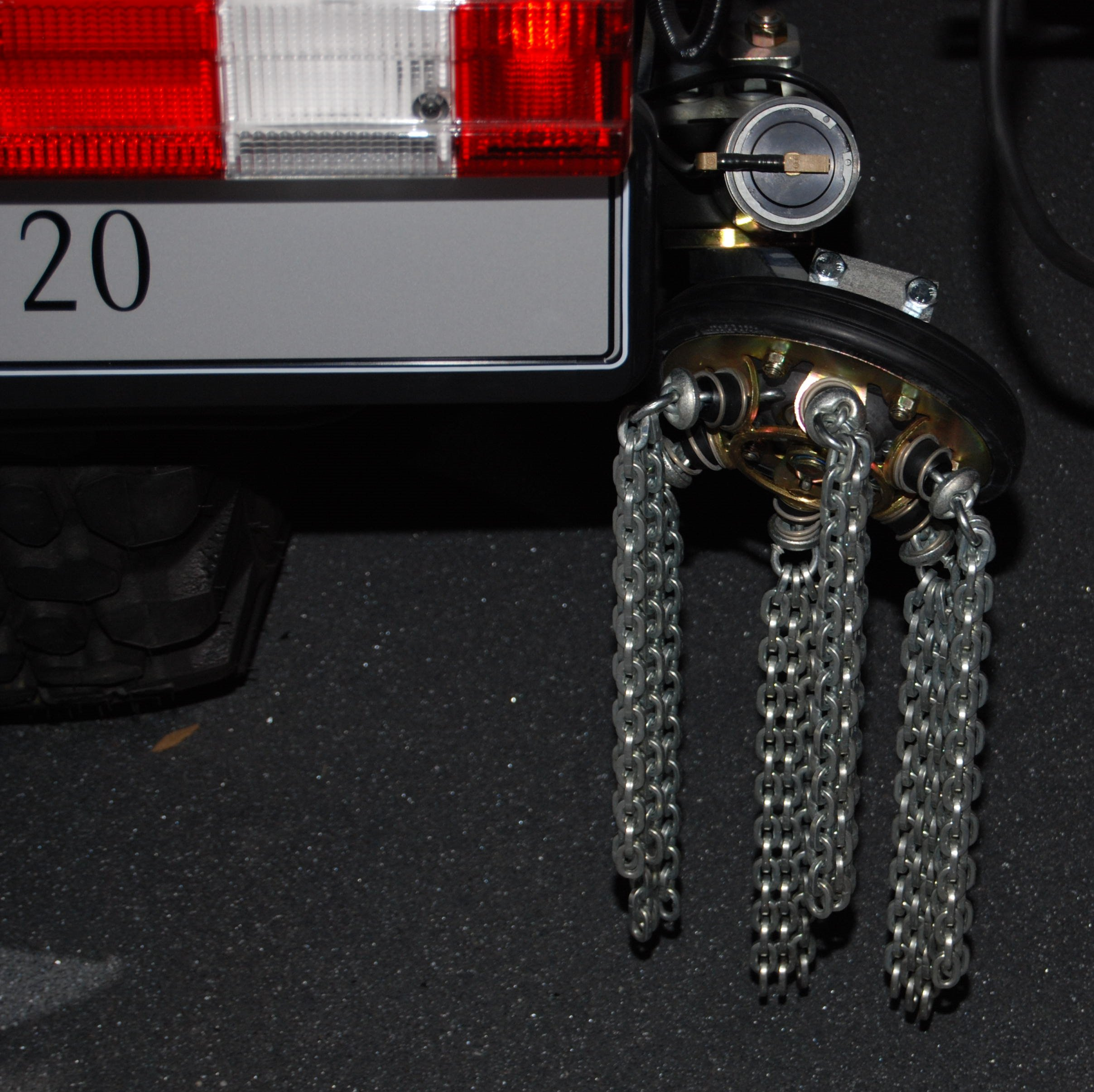
Automatic tire chains are permanently mounted near the drive tires and engage by turning a switch, then move into position to fling the pieces of chain under the tires automatically. Automatic chains were invented in 1941 in the United States and Sweden in 1977.

Snow chains, or tire chains, are devices fitted to the tires of vehicles to provide increased traction when driving through snow and ice.

Snow chains attach to the drive wheels of a vehicle or special systems deploy chains which swing under the tires automatically. Although named after steel chain, snow chains may be made of other materials and in a variety of patterns and strengths. Chains are usually sold in pairs and often must be purchased to match a particular tire size (tire diameter and tread width), although some designs can be adjusted to fit various sizes of tire. Driving with chains reduces fuel efficiency, and can reduce the allowable speed of the automobile to approximately 50 km/h (30 mph), but increase traction and braking on snowy or icy surfaces. Some regions require chains to be used under some weather conditions, but other areas prohibit the use of chains, as they can damage road surfaces.

== History ==
Snow chains were invented in 1904 by Harry D. Weed in Canastota, New York. Weed received U.S. patent 0,768,495 for his "Grip-Tread for Pneumatic Tires" on August 23, 1904. Weed's great-grandson, James Weed, said that Harry got the idea of creating chains for tires when he saw drivers wrap rope, or even vines, around their tires to increase traction on muddy or snowy roads. At this time, most people in rural Northern regions wouldn't bother driving automobiles in the winter at all, since roads were usually rolled for use with horse-drawn sleighs, rather than plowed. Automobiles were generally not winter vehicles, for a variety of reasons until the 1930s or 1940s in some areas. Only in urban areas was it possible to remove snow from streets. He sought to make a traction device that was more durable and would work with snow as well as mud.

In January 1923, American inventor Oscar E. Brown obtained U.S. patent 1,440,580 for his “Nonskid Attachment for Vehicle Tires”.

In July 1935, the Canadian Auguste Trudeau obtained a patent for his tread and anti-skidding chain.

== Deployment ==
In snowy conditions, transportation authorities may require that snow chains or other traction aids be installed on vehicles, or at least supplied for them. This could apply to all vehicles, or only those which lack other traction aids, such as four-wheel drive and/or special tires. Local requirements may be enforced at checkpoints or by other type of inspection. Snow chains should be installed on one or more drive axles of the vehicle, with requirements varying for dual-tire or multi-driven-axle vehicles that range from "one pair of tires on a driven axle" to "all tires on all driven axles", possibly also one or both steering (front) wheels, requiring snow chains whenever required by signage or conditions.

On wheel loaders, it is recommended to use special protection chains due to the intense pressure on tires during work.

== United States ==
Tires come with standardized tire code sizing information, found on the sidewalls of the tires. The first letter(s), indicate the vehicle type (P for passenger, LT for light truck). The next three digits indicate the tire's width in millimeters. The middle two digit number indicates the tire's height-to-width ratio. The next character is a letter "R", which indicates radial ply tires (rather than radius). followed by a final two digit number indicating the rim size for the vehicle's wheels.

Additionally, the correct Society of Automotive Engineers (SAE) class of snow chains must be installed, based on the wheel clearance of the vehicle.

SAE traction device class	Minimum tread-face clearance (A)	Minimum side-wall clearance (B)
Class S	1.46 in (37 mm)	0.59 in (15 mm)
Class U	1.97 in (50 mm)	0.91 in (23 mm)
Class W	2.50 in (64 mm)	1.50 in (38 mm)

The SAE Class "S" well clearance is a common requirement on newer cars, especially if after-market wider, low-profile, or larger tires and/or wheels are fitted.

The classes are defined as follows:

- SAE Class S: Regular (non-reinforced) passenger tire traction devices for vehicles with restricted wheel well clearance.
- SAE Class U: Regular (non-reinforced) and lug-reinforced passenger tire traction devices for vehicles with regular (non-restricted) wheel well clearances.
- SAE Class W: Passenger tire traction devices that use light truck components, as well as some light truck traction devices.

== Common chain failures ==
- Driving too fast with chains. Recommended maximum speeds in the owners' manual of the chains – generally 30 to 50 km/h (20 to 30 mph) – maximum.
- Driving on dry roads with chains for extended periods of time.
- Driving on dry roads with chains can cause a vehicle to slide when braking.
- Driving on dry roads with chains will rapidly wear the chains.
- Not securing the chains tightly enough. Owners' manual of the chains recommends tightening a second time after driving a short distance and checking for tightness from time to time. If a chain comes loose, it should either be refastened or removed before it wraps around the drive axle of the vehicle.
- Tensioners or adjusters may be required. (Some chains have automatic tensioners and may be damaged if tensioners are used.)
- Installing chains on non-drive wheels.
- Accelerating too rapidly causing tire spin and stress on chains
- If a chain does break, it can cause vehicle damage by slapping around inside the wheel well, possibly wrapping around the axle and severing brake lines

== Varieties and alternatives ==
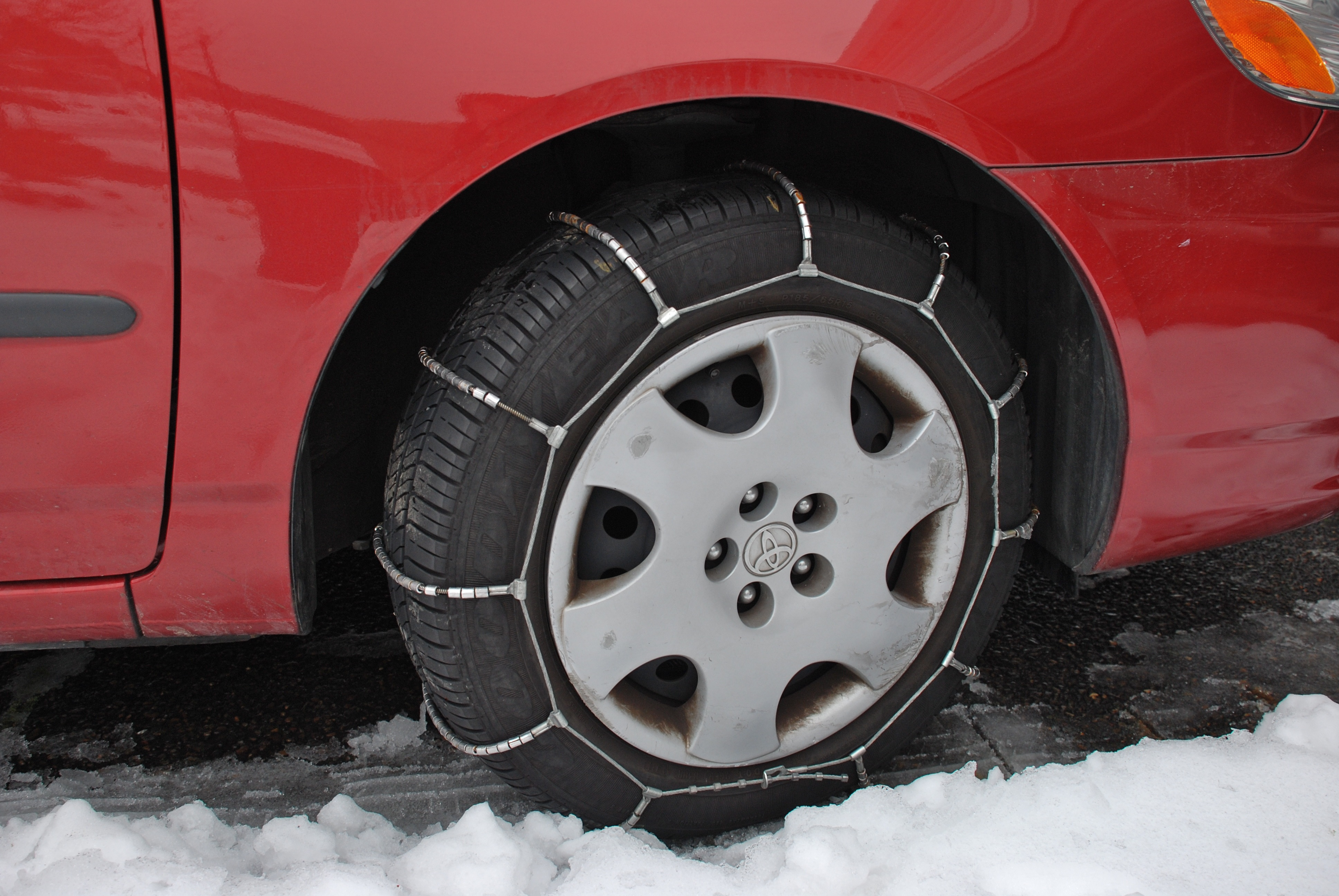
Cable chains on a car tire, with a relatively simple and easy-to-secure design; this is a ladder-type or "radial" design

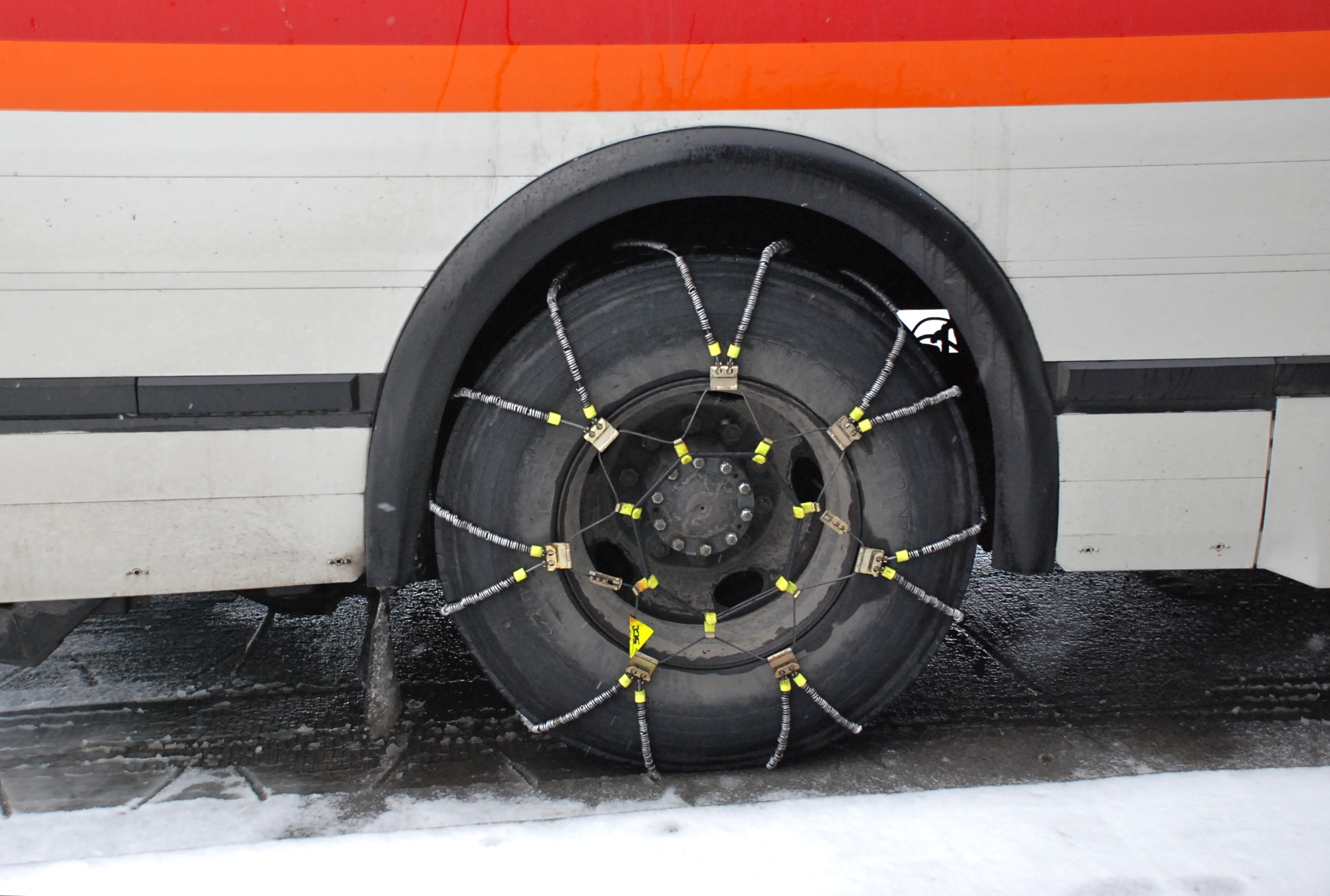
Cable chains on a bus tire

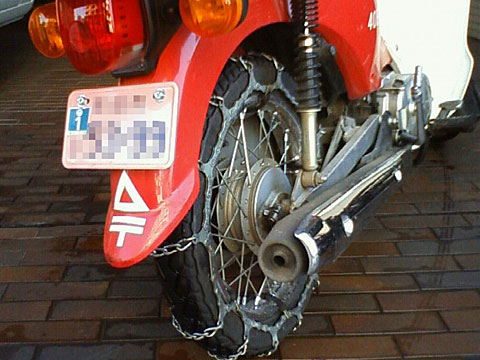
Snow chains on a motorcycle

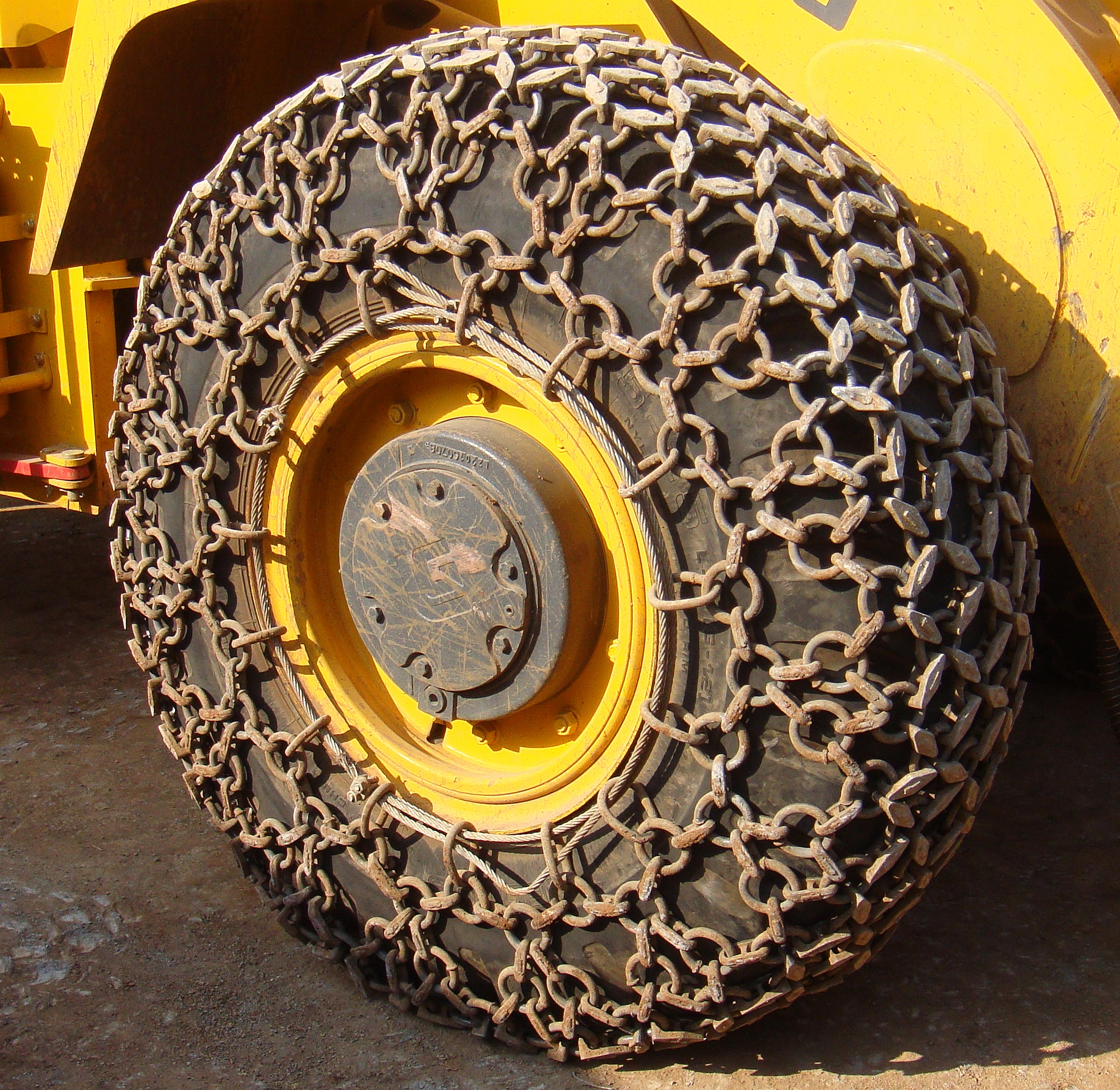
Traction chains on a wheel loader

Tire chains are available in a variety of types that have different advantages of cost, ride smoothness, traction, durability, ease of installation, and recommended travel speed.

Materials include steel (in the form of links or cables), polyurethane, rubber, and fabric. The original-style steel-link chains are also available in a variety of carbon steel and steel alloys and link shapes. Link shapes include standard, twisted, square, and reinforced. The shape of the links changes the flexibility, grip, and strength of the chain. The links can also have added studs or V-bars for an even more aggressive traction. The use of alloy steel and hardened steel adds durability. Traction cables (cable chains, snow cables) attach like chains but are made from cable rather than chain.

Chain patterns include the ladder, diagonal, or pattern types. Ladder-type chains have cross chains perpendicular to the road and look like a ladder when carefully laid on the ground. With diagonal chains, the cross chains are diagonal to the road. Pattern types form a "net" over the tire such as a diamond or multiple diamond pattern. Some industrial pattern types also include studded, metal rings to which the chains attach and thus are called ring chains.

Most tire chains are wrapped around the circumference of the tires and held in place with rim chains, which may be chain or cable, elastic or adjustable tensioners. Automatic chains do not wrap around the tire but swing under the tire from devices permanently mounted under the vehicle which deploy via an electronic solenoid activated in the cab. Some tire chains mount onto the tires from only one side. Others use a ratcheting system for easier installation.

Alternatives include studded tires, which are snow tires with metal studs individually mounted into holes in the treads; emergency traction devices which may be similar to tire chains but mount around the tire through openings in the rim; and snow socks, which are fabric rather than chain or cable. These alternatives allow higher operating speeds than snow chains and, in the case of studs, do not require installation by the vehicle operator, but chains generally give the best traction in severe conditions.

Mud chains are similar to snow chains but for off-road, four-wheel drive applications, and generally they are larger than snow chains; they are often seen on heavy off-road equipment like log skidders, which have to operate over very rough, muddy terrain.

Wheel tracks are heavy duty assemblies similar to chains but with rigid cross links such as sometimes used on logging equipment.

== Regulations governing use ==
(see also Snow tires regulations tables)

Snow chain laws vary from no restrictions, to restricted (e.g. "only from Oct 1 to Apr 30" or "only if conditions require"), to prohibited altogether to preserve road surfaces.

In large countries with diverse topographies, such as the United States and Canada, chain laws and ordinances vary regionally by state, province, or other local jurisdiction.

== See also ==
- Crampons
- Ice cleat
- Snow socks
- Snow tires
