= Indiana University Southeast =

Public university in New Albany, Indiana, U.S.

- Former names: Indiana University Falls City Area Center (1941–1945); Indiana University Jeffersonville Extension Center (1945–1968)
- Type: Public regional master's university
- Established: 1941; 85 years ago
- Academic affiliations: IU System; Kentuckiana Metroversity
- Endowment: $14.8 million
- Chancellor: Debbie Ford
- Faculty: 225
- Students: 5,238 (2017)
- Undergraduates: 4,823
- Postgraduates: 415
- Location: New Albany, Indiana, U.S. 38°20′42″N 85°49′09″W
- Campus: Suburban, 177 acres (72 ha)
- Colors: Cream & Crimson
- Nickname: Grenadiers
- Sporting affiliations: NAIA – River States
- Mascot: Gus the Grenadier
- Website: southeast.iu.edu

Indiana University Southeast (locally known as IU Southeast or IUS) is a public university in New Albany, Indiana, United States. It is a regional campus of Indiana University.

== History ==
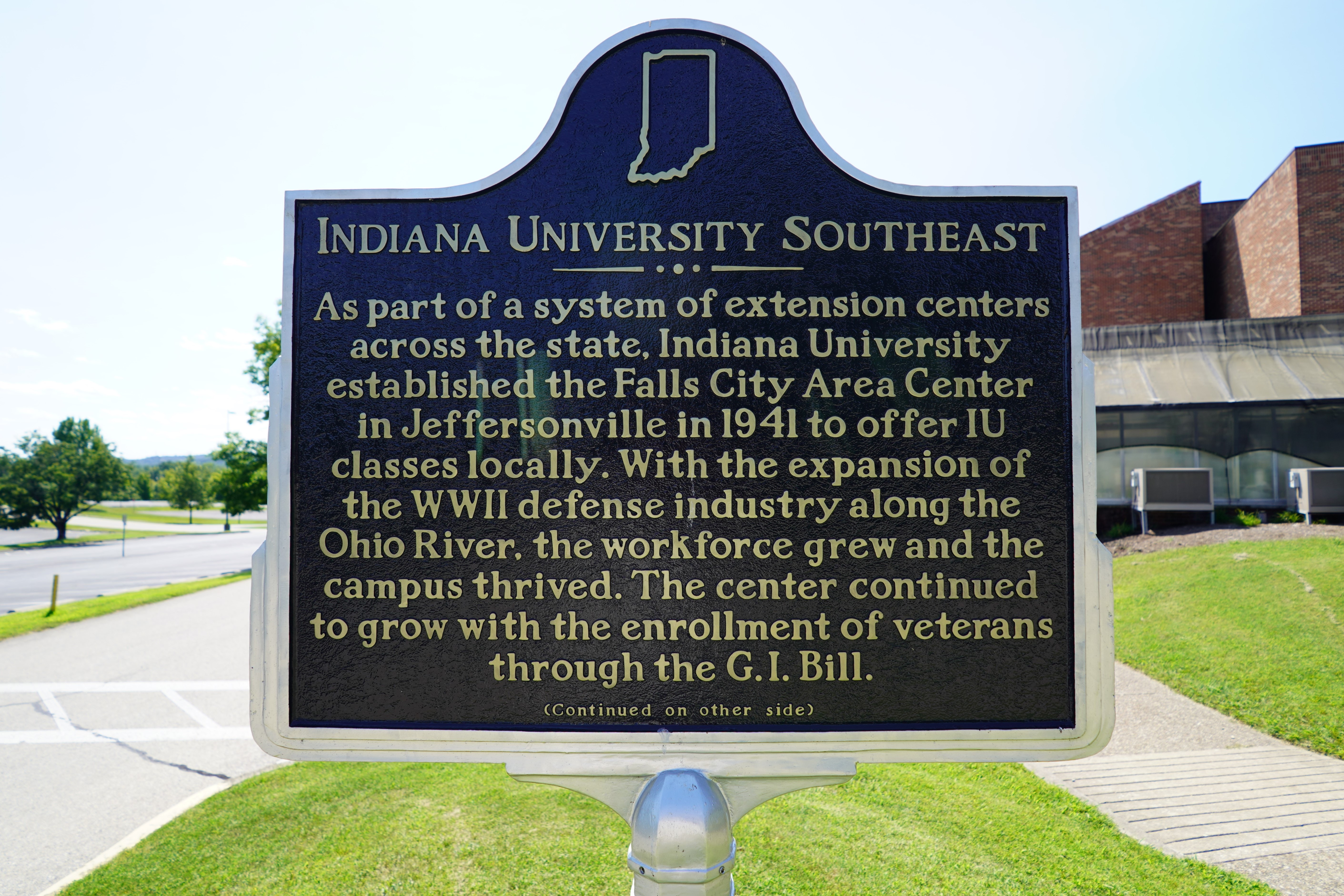
Indiana University Southeast Historical Marker

The Indiana University Falls City Area Center was established by Floyd McMurray in 1941 as an extension center of Indiana University in New Albany, Indiana, and Jeffersonville, Indiana. Classes were initially held in classrooms at New Albany High School and Hazelwood Junior High School in New Albany, and at Jeffersonville High School in Jeffersonville. In 1945, IU Southeast moved into its own building in Jeffersonville, named the Indiana University Jeffersonville Extension Center.

As an extension center, IU Southeast's purpose was to permit freshmen and sophomore students to take classes near their residence before transferring to the Indiana University Bloomington main campus. The Indiana University Jeffersonville Extension Center was renamed Indiana University Southeast during 1968. Also, IU Southeast granted its first degrees in 1968.

IU Southeast moved to its current 177-acre (0.72 km^{2}) campus in New Albany, Indiana during 1973.

== Campus ==
IU Southeast is located 15 minutes north of downtown Louisville, Kentucky, in suburban New Albany, Indiana, at the edge of southern Indiana's picturesque "knobs," which is a region of rolling hills that run parallel to the Ohio River. The campus spreads over 180 acres (73 ha) just north of I-265 in Southern Indiana.

The Greater Louisville Regional Japanese Saturday School (グレータールイビル日本語補習校 Gurētā Ruibiru Nihongo Hoshūkō), a Japanese weekend supplementary school, is affiliated with IUS's Japan Center. It was established in January 1988 and holds its classes at Hillside Hall; its office is elsewhere in New Albany.

== Academics ==
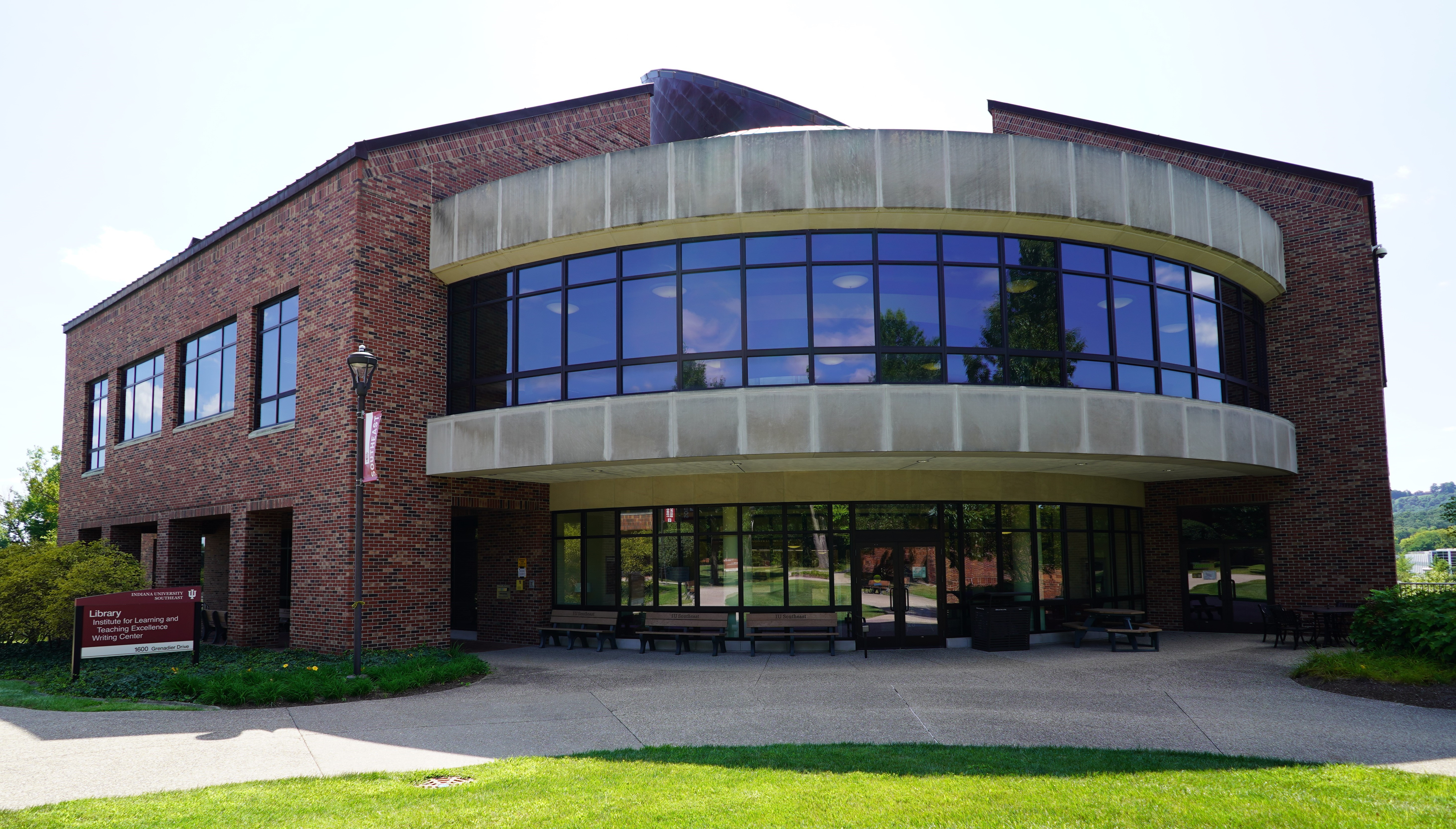
Indiana University Southeast Library

IUS is best known for its bachelor's degree programs in business, nursing, and education. The university offers over 55 degree programs, including master's, bachelor's, and associate's. IUS is organized into six schools: the School of Arts and Letters, School of Business, School of Education, School of Natural Sciences, School of Nursing, and the School of Social Sciences.

Several programs on the IUS campus are accredited in specific fields and/or have received regional or national recognition for the work of the students and faculty. All three professional schools are accredited by the appropriate bodies in their fields; the School of Business is accredited by the Association to Advance Collegiate Schools of Business, the School of Education is accredited by the Council for the Accreditation of Educator Preparation, and the School of Nursing is accredited by the Commission on Collegiate Nursing Education. Additionally, the Biochemistry track is the Chemistry Program is accredited by the American Chemical Society.

== Residence halls ==
Indiana University Southeast broke ground on its residence halls on June 27, 2007. With the addition of residence halls, IUS is the first full-service public institution in the south-central sector of the state. The five lodge-style residence halls are the first on-campus housing at IUS. The lodges feature one, two, and four bedroom units with each bedroom opening to a central living room.

The buildings opened for the fall 2008 semester and now house more than 400 students. The $20.7 million project is a major economic force both locally and across the region. The total impact to the local economy is approximately $44 million and the regional economy gets a boost of nearly $4 million each year.

IU Southeast's residence halls were named on Niche's 2016 Best College Dorms list based on records from 1,713 public and private traditional 4-year colleges and universities across the United States. Niche based its rankings on student reviews and key statistics like average housing cost, housing capacity and student housing crime rate.

== Student media ==
IUS is served by The Horizon, the student-run multimedia organization at the school. The Horizon won the Pacemaker Award in 2015, widely considered to be the Pulitzer Prize for college journalism. Also in 2015, the Horizon won the College Media Association's Pinnacle Award for Four-Year Less-Than-Weekly Newspaper of the Year.

In 2014 and 2015, Horizon student journalists won more awards in the Society of Professional Journalists Louisville Pro Chapter's contests than all other colleges in the metro region combined.

All students are able to join The Horizon staff, though students majoring in journalism at IUS are required to work for at least two semesters on The Horizon staff. IUS is the only university in the Louisville metro area to offer a bachelor's degree in journalism.

== Athletics ==
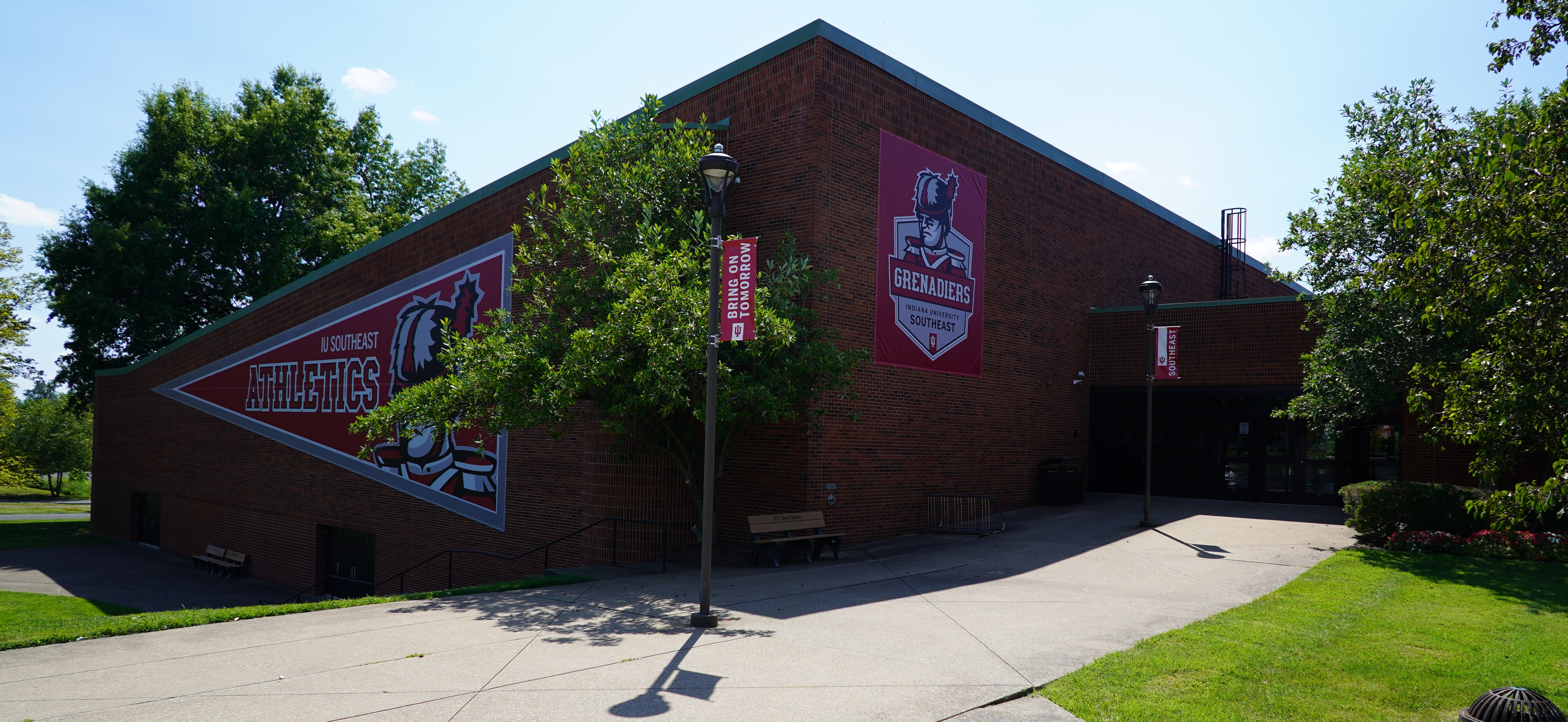
Indiana Southeast University Gym

The Indiana–Southeast (IUS or IU Southeast) athletic teams are branded as the IU Southeast Grenadiers. The university is a member of the National Association of Intercollegiate Athletics (NAIA), primarily competing in the River States Conference (RSC) since the 1994–95 academic year. The Grenadiers had previously competed as an Independent from 1978 to 1979 (when the school joined the NAIA) to 1993–94.

IU Southeast competes in ten intercollegiate varsity sports: Men's sports include baseball, basketball and tennis; while women's sports include basketball, softball, tennis and volleyball; and co-ed sports include cheerleading and pep band. Club sports include co-ed bass fishing.

=== History ===
The women's athletic programs became the IU Southeast's first accredited athletic program when they became affiliated with the Association of Intercollegiate Athletics for Women (AIAW) in 1975–76. In that same year, there was an attempt to affiliate IU Southeast with the Division III ranks of the National Collegiate Athletic Association (NCAA). IU Bloomington did not approve this, however, on the grounds that only one IU campus could be affiliated with the NCAA. (Note: This policy no longer exists. IU's Indianapolis campus, established when IU's joint campus with Purdue University was dissolved in 2024, has an NCAA Division I athletic program. IU's joint campus in Fort Wayne also had a Division I athletic program from 2007 until the campus was split into separate IU- and Purdue-affiliated schools in 2018, with the athletic program transferring to the Purdue-affiliated school.) Thus, steps were initiated to affiliate with the NAIA. These efforts culminated with active membership being attained in 1978. In 1982, the AIAW folded and the NAIA added women's programs to the organization.

In time for the 1979–80 season, IUS added an activities building. This facility has a seating capacity of approximately 1,624. There are a number of programs available to students including intramurals, a fitness facility, and classes that focus on fitness. The building has undergone various improvements over the years including new bleachers and lighting in 2013 and HVAC and IT upgrades in 2015.

For the 2006–2007 academic year, 15 IUS students were named by the RSC, known before 2016 as the KIAC, as "KIAC Scholar Athletes". Students who are awarded this honor must have maintained a 3.25 or higher GPA while attending classes full-time and have participated in one or more athletics programs. During the 2005–2006 academic year, 14 IU Southeast students were awarded this honor as well.

The schools mascot for sporting events is a Grenadier. In the 2007–2008 academic year, IUS won the KIAC conference championship in the following sports: baseball, basketball, softball, as well as men's and women's tennis. Pat Mrozowski was named KIAC Athletic Director of the Year.

Joe Glover was named director of athletics on July 1, 2010.

Glover created and implemented the first athletic scholarship fundraising dinner for IUS; the inaugural Champions Dinner was held on August 24, 2013. The event was a major success for the department and yielded nearly $30,000 for student-athlete scholarships in its first year.

Many of the IUS athletic facilities have been upgraded during Glover's tenure as athletic director. In 2012, Glover led a $35,000 renovation of The Koetter Sports Baseball complex, which included a new infield surface and improved drainage. In 2011, new upgraded seating was added to the Activities Building, and a new infield surface was designed installed at the Koetter Sports Softball complex. The tennis programs also received a newly renovated tennis shed during Glover's tenure. In 2014, two tennis courts at IU Southeast had lights installed to allow for play during the evening. Glover also spearheaded the effort for the Grenadier baseball and softball programs to create a new indoor hitting facility that now allows for the teams to practice all year.

The IUS athletic programs have experience unparalleled success during Glover's tenure. The IU Southeast men's basketball team won seven-straight conference regular season championships and six tournament championships from 2008 to 2014.

Every team has competed in the RSC championship game of its respective sport during Glover's tenure. The Grenadiers have won a combined 15 RSC Regular Season Championships, 12 RSC Tournament Championships, and qualified for 13 NAIA National Tournaments with Glover's leadership. The IU Southeast Athletic Department was also awarded the distinguished RSC (then KIAC) Commissioner's Cup in 2011 and 2012.

During the 2012–13 school year, the IUS men's basketball team advanced to the semifinals of the 2013 NAIA Division II Men's National Basketball Championship in Point Lookout, Mo. IU Southeast fell 69–56 to eventual national champion Cardinal Stritch.

The Grenadiers were ranked as high as No. 2 in the nation during that season and advanced to the first NAIA Final Four in program history.

Glover was recognized for his efforts by his colleagues when he was named KIAC Athletic Director of the Year for 2012–13. In May 2013, Glover was also named one of "20 Under 40 Best and Brightest" business professionals in a special edition of the Southern Indiana Business Source magazine.

The Grenadiers have been one of the most successful athletic programs in the RSC, winning the RSC Commissioner's Cup five times since 2008. The trophy is awarded to the team with the best regular season performance in all sports combined.

During the 2013–14 school year, the IUS athletic department set a record with an average department grade-point average of above 3.00 for the first time. Four teams had average GPAs above a 3.0 as well.

== Notable alumni ==
- Kevin Boehnlein, former member of the Indiana Senate
- Serena Deeb, Professional Wrestler
- Jazzmarr Ferguson, professional basketball player who last played for Vanoli Cremona of the Lega Basket Serie A
- Ron Gettelfinger, President of the United Auto Workers labor union
- Diego Morales, 63rd Secretary of State of Indiana
- Connie Sipes, former member of the Indiana Senate
- Mike Sodrel, former United States Representative
