= Kevin Boehnlein =

U.S. politician

Member of the Indiana Senate from the 46th district
- In office November 16, 2021 – November 22, 2022
- Preceded by: Ron Grooms
- Succeeded by: Andrea Hunley

Personal details
- Party: Republican
- Education: Indiana University Southeast (BA); University of Southern Indiana (MBA)

Kevin M. Boehnlein is an American politician who served as a member of the Indiana Senate from the 46th district. He assumed office on November 16, 2021, and ended his term on November 22, 2022.

== Early life and education ==
Boehnlein is a native of Jeffersonville, Indiana. He earned a Bachelor of Arts degree in political science from Indiana University Southeast and a Master of Business Administration from the University of Southern Indiana.

== Career ==
Since 2004, Boehnlein has worked as a financial advisor at Edward Jones Investments. He also served as the chief of staff for Regina Overton during her tenure as mayor of New Albany, Indiana. He managed Mike Sodrel's 2004 campaign for Indiana's 9th congressional district. Boehnlein was elected to the Indiana Senate in a special caucus after Ron Grooms resigned.
