= Snow tire =

Tires designed for use on snow and ice

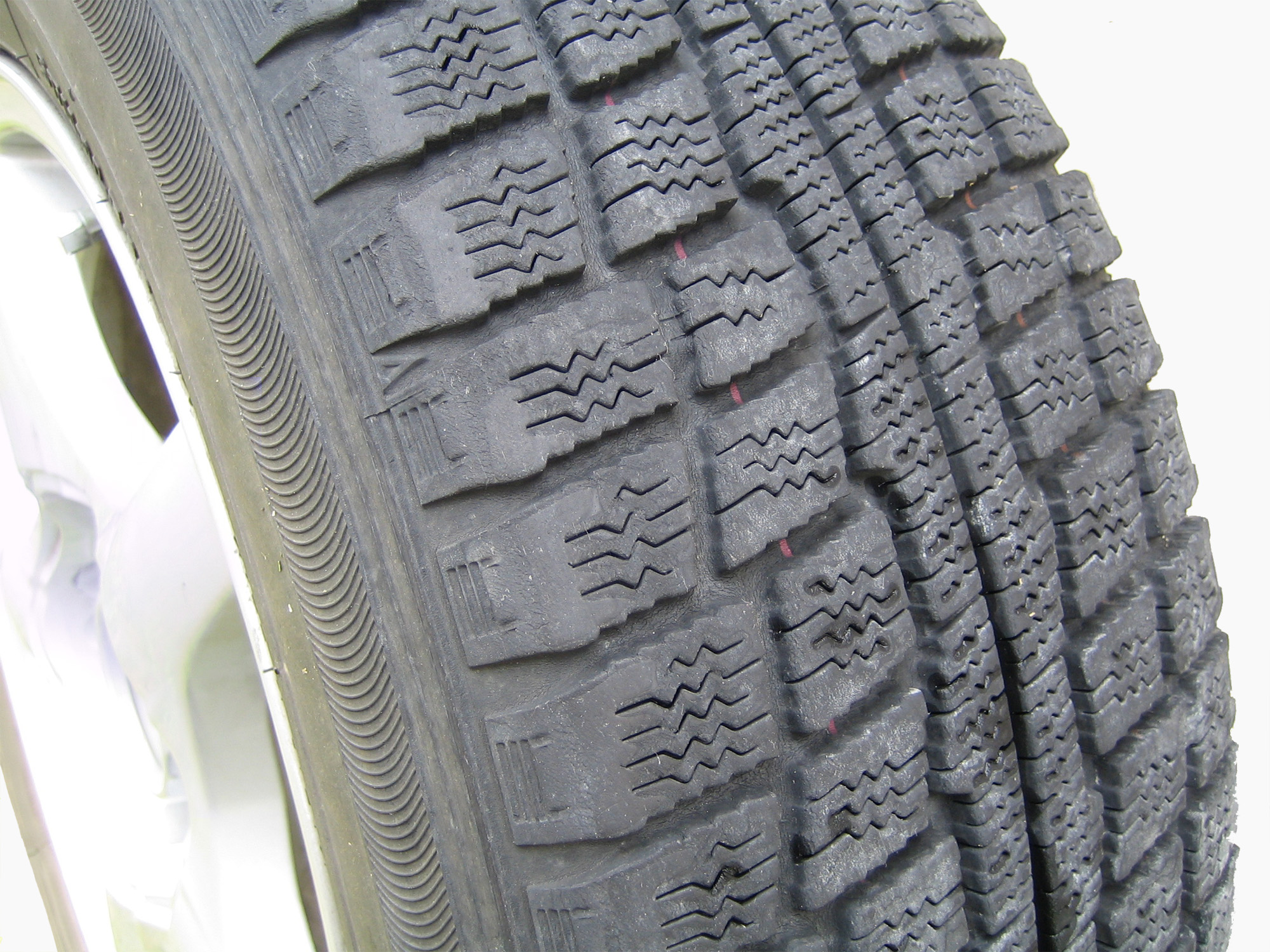
Winter tire, showing tread pattern designed to compact snow in the gaps.

Snow tires, also known as winter tires, are tires designed for use on snow and ice. Snow tires have a tread design with larger gaps than those on conventional tires, increasing traction on snow and ice and are often optimized to drive at temperatures below 7 °C (45 °F). Tires that meet specific standards and or tests are entitled to display M+S, a Three Peak Mountain Snow Flake (3PMSF), and or an Ice Grip Symbol (IGS) on their sidewalls. Studded tires are a type of snow tires which have metal or ceramic studs that protrude from the tire to increase traction on hard-packed snow or ice and have parallel standards including the use of the 3PMSF symbol with a Ш (the Cyrillic letter "Sha") along with "STUDDED" and the IGS. Studs abrade dry pavement, causing dust and creating wear in the wheel path. Regulations that require the use of snow tires or permit the use of studs vary by jurisdiction.

All-season tires have tread gaps that are smaller than snow tires and larger than conventional tires. They are quieter than winter tires on clear roads, but less capable on snow or ice.

== Roadway conditions in winter ==
Snow tires operate on a variety of surfaces, including pavement (wet or dry), mud, ice, or snow. The tread design of snow tires is adapted primarily to allow penetration of the snow into the tread, where it compacts and provides resistance against slippage. The snow strength developed by compaction depends on the properties of the snow, which depend on its temperature and water content—wetter, warmer snow compacts better than dry, colder snow up to a point where the snow is so wet that it lubricates the tire-road interface. New and powder snow have densities of 0.1 to 0.3 g/cm^{3} (6 to 20 lb/cu ft). Compacted snow may have densities of 0.45 to 0.75 g/cm^{3} (28 to 47 lb/cu ft).

Snow or ice-covered roadways present lower braking and cornering friction, compared to dry conditions. The roadway friction properties of snow, in particular, are a function of temperature. At temperatures below −7 °C (20 °F), snow crystals are harder and generate more friction as a tire passes over them than at warmer conditions with snow or ice on the road surface. However, as temperatures rise above −2 °C (28 °F), the presence of free water increasingly lubricates the snow or ice and diminishes tire friction. Hydrophilic rubber compounds help create friction in the presence of water or ice.

Dry and moist snow conditions on roadways

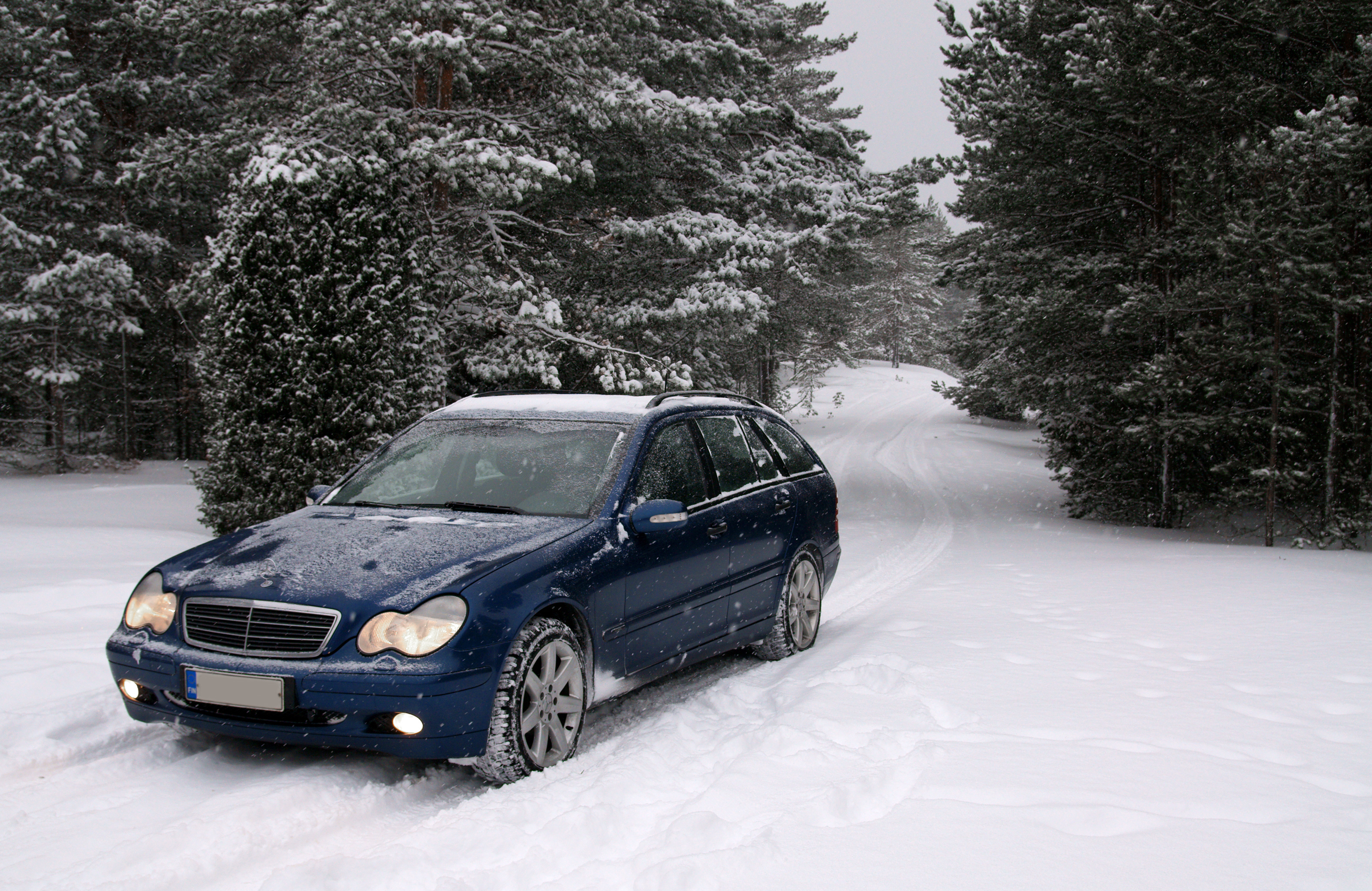
Vehicle in cold, dry, powder snow, which offers comparatively better traction than moist snow.

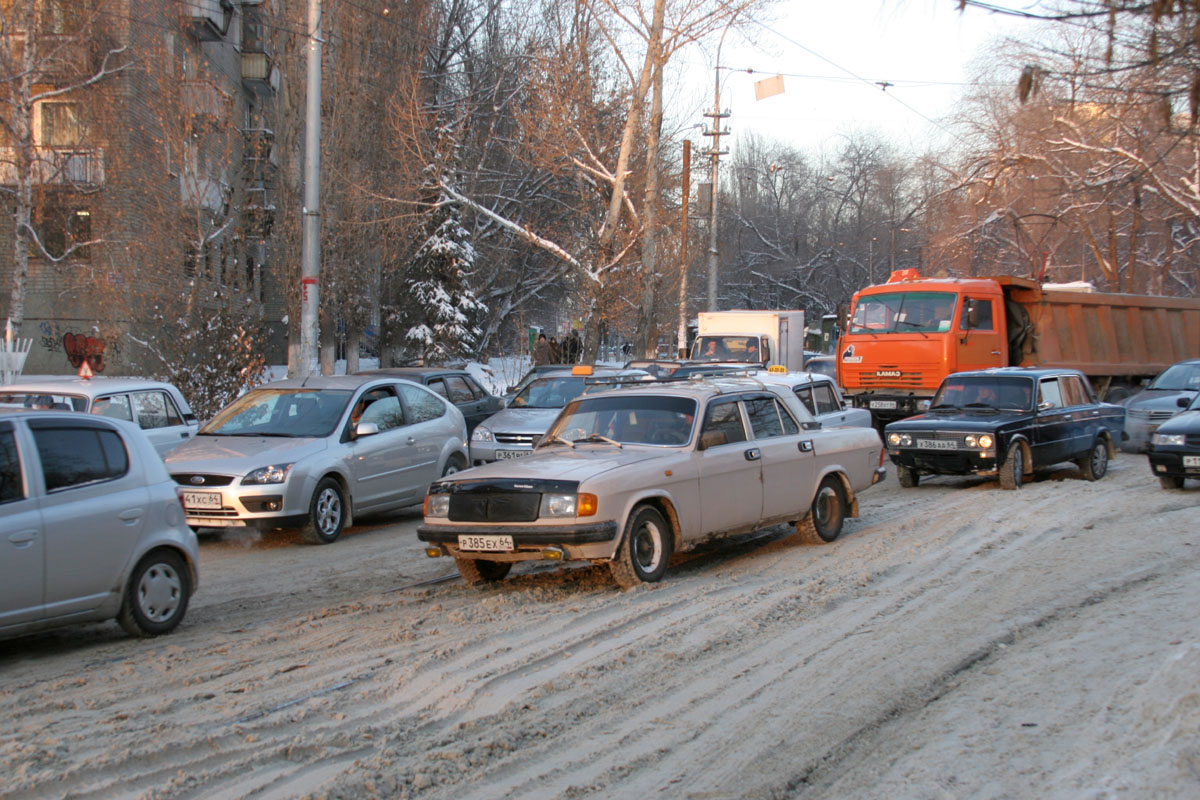
Vehicles in warm, moist, granular snow encounter decreased roadway traction.

=== Tire/snow interactions ===
The compacted snow develops strength against slippage along a shear plane parallel to the contact area of the tire on the ground. At the same time, the bottom of the tire treads compress the snow on which they are bearing, also creating friction. The process of compacting snow within the treads requires it to be expelled in time for the tread to compact snow anew on the next rotation. The compaction/contact process works both in the direction of travel for propulsion and braking, but also laterally for cornering.

The deeper the snow that the tire rolls through, the higher the resistance encountered by the tire, as it compacts the snow it encounters and plows some of it to either side. At some point on a given angle of uphill pitch, this resistance becomes greater than the resistance to slippage achieved by the tread's contact with the snow and the tires with power begin to slip and spin. Deeper snow means that climbing a hill without spinning the powered wheels becomes more difficult. However, the plowing/compaction effect aids in braking to the extent that it creates rolling resistance.

Tire/snow interactions

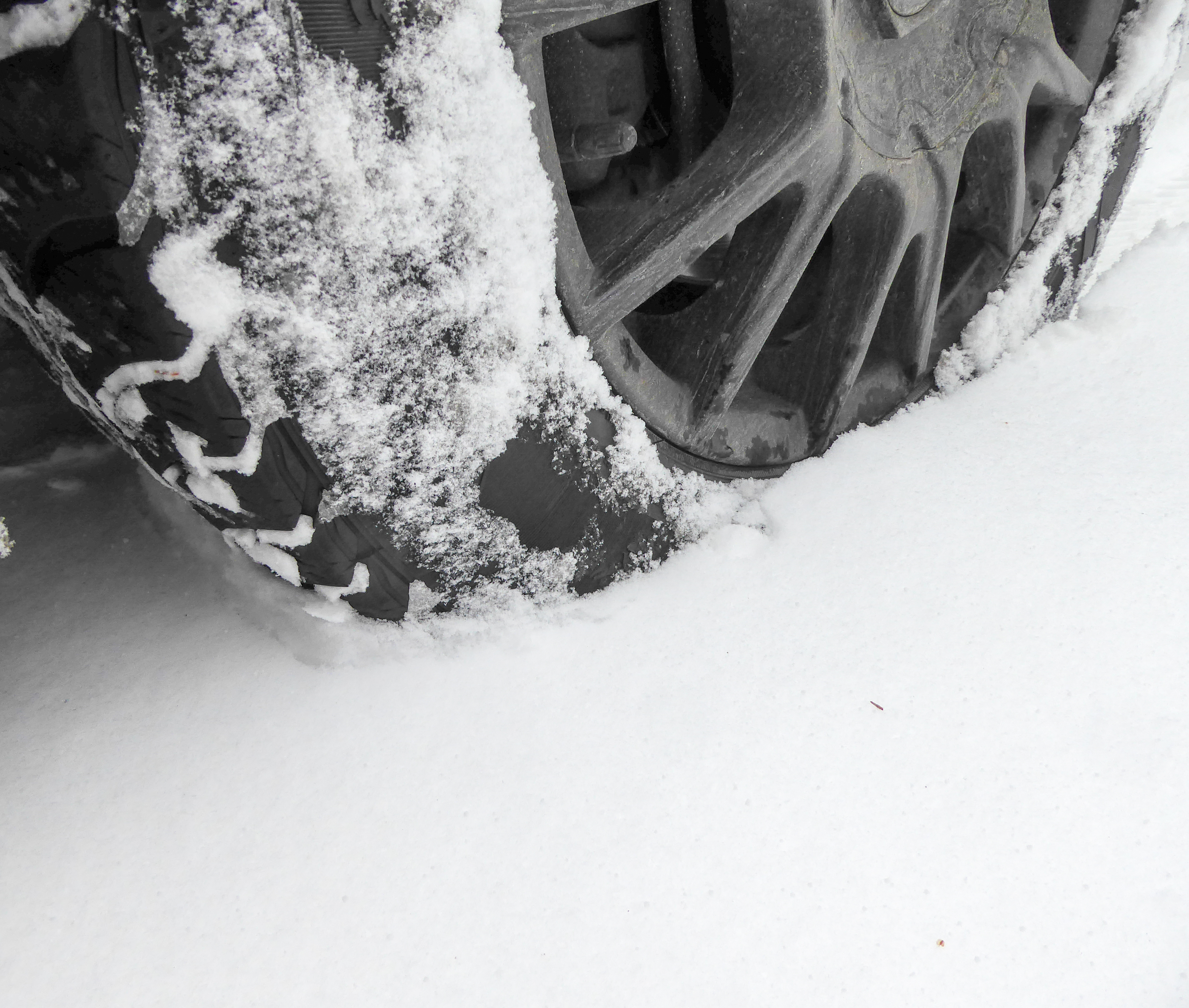
Compaction of snow under an advancing snow tire, causing rolling resistance while passing through about 10 centimetres (4 in) of snow.

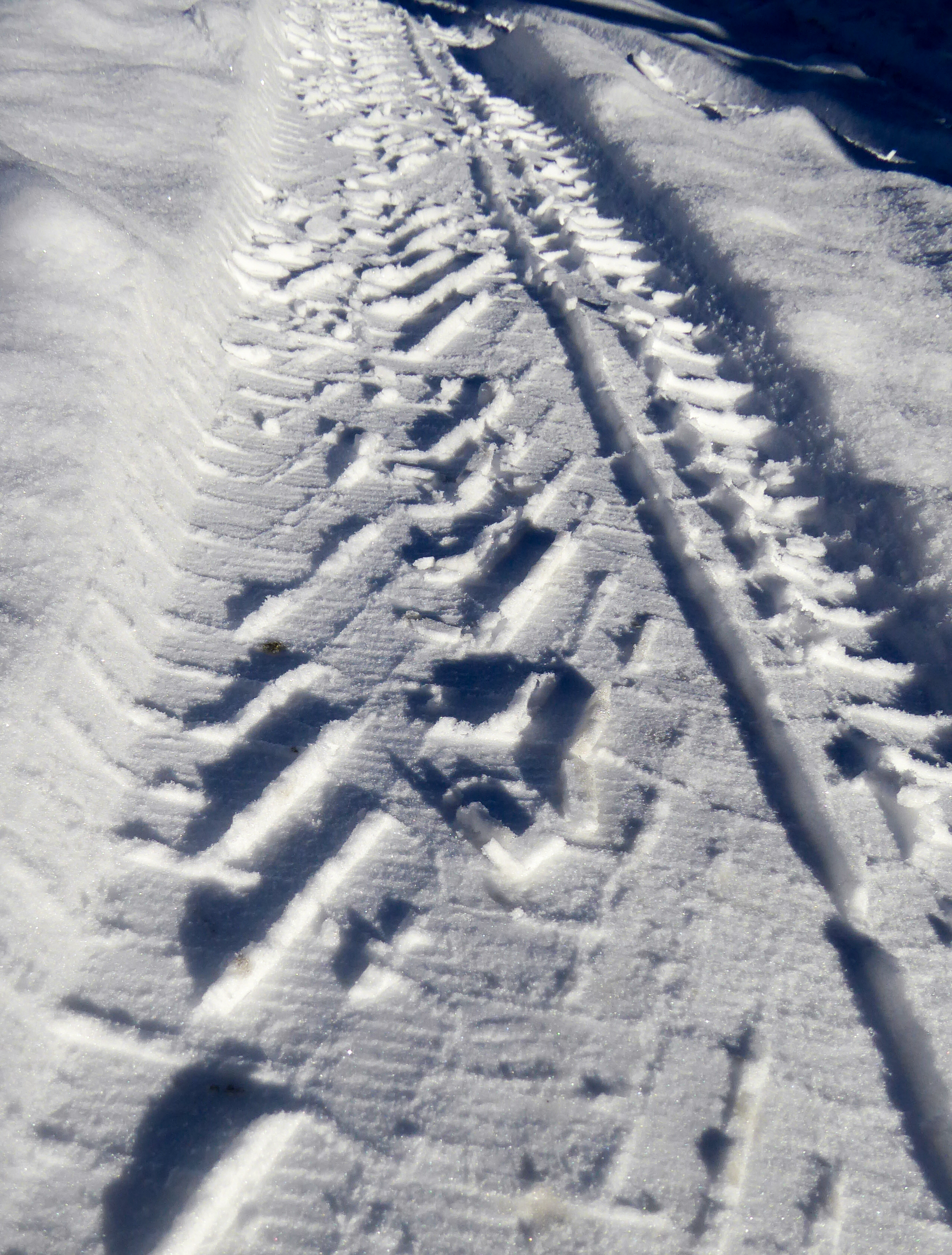
Compaction in about 5 centimetres (2 in) of snow left behind a snow tire, showing tread-snow interaction.

=== Tread ===
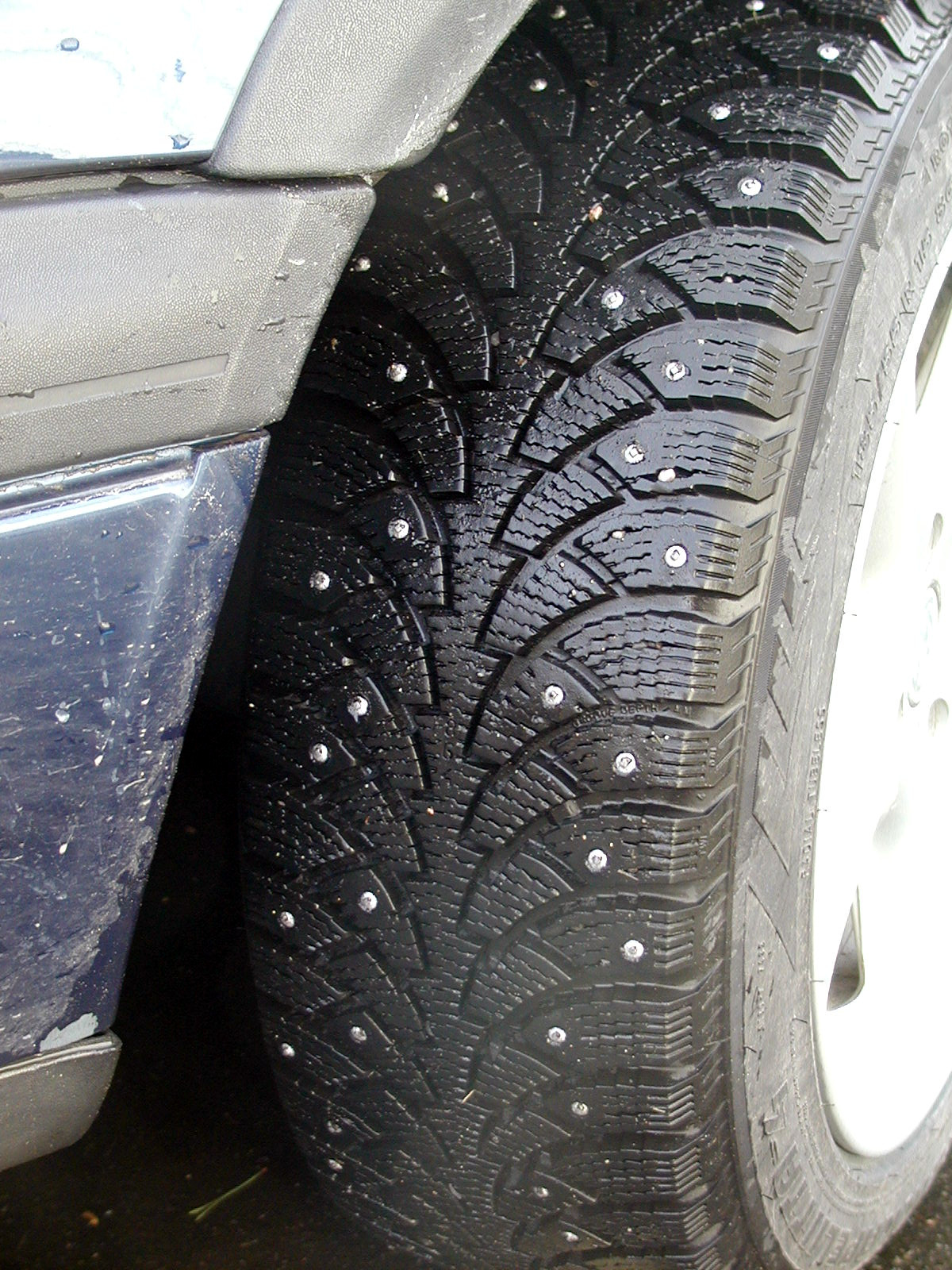
Snow tire with metal studs, which improve traction on icy surfaces.

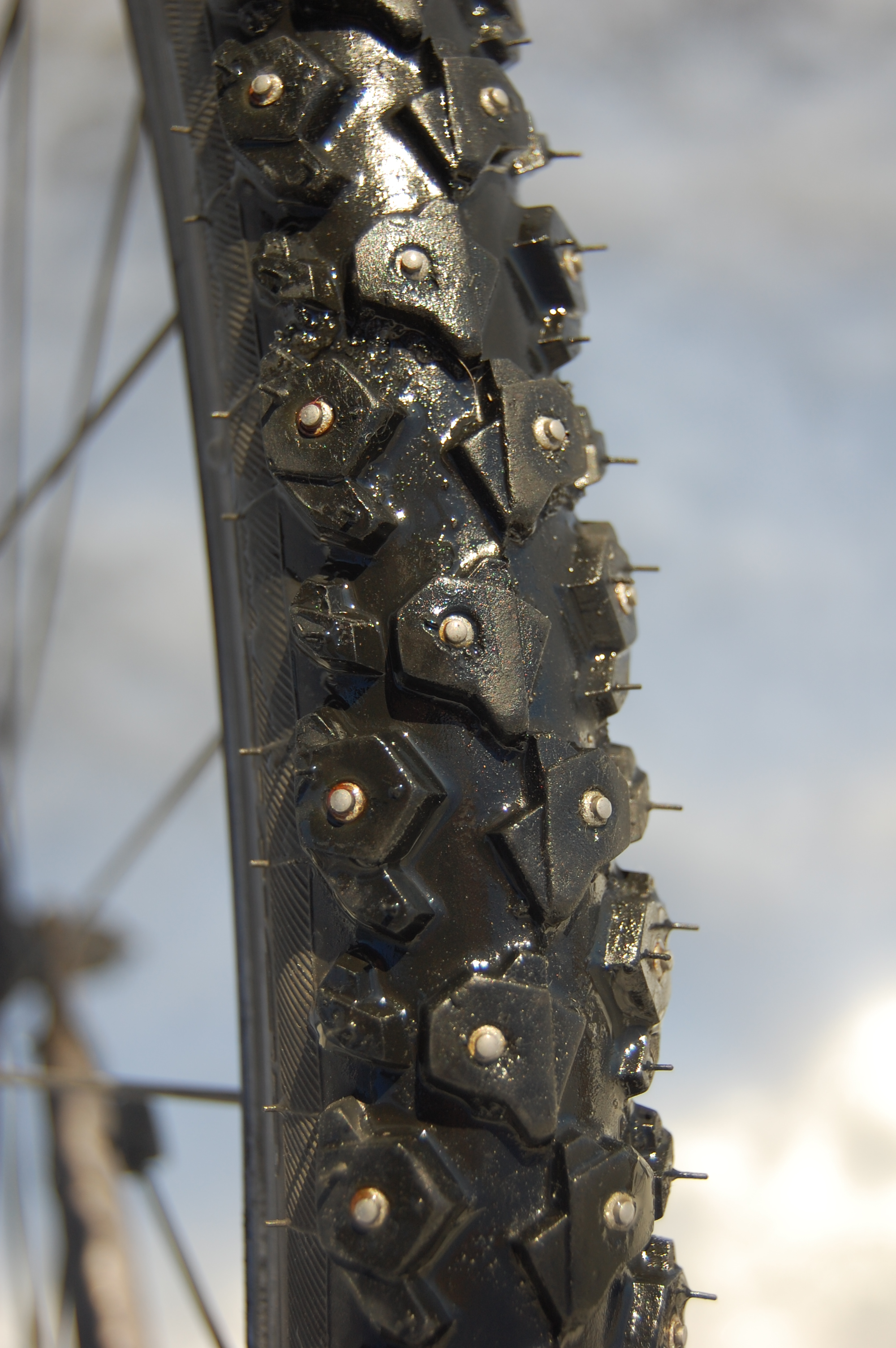
Nokian bicycle winter tyre

Attributes that can distinguish snow tires from "all-season" and summer tires include the following:

- An open, deep tread, with a high void ratio between rubber and spaces between the solid rubber
- Shoulder blocks, a specialized tread design at the outside of the tire tread to increase snow contact and friction
- A narrower aspect ratio between the diameter of the tire and the tread width to minimize resistance from the plowing effect of the tire through deeper snow
- Hydrophilic rubber compounds that improve friction on wet surfaces
- Additional siping, or thin slits in the rubber, that provide more biting edges and improve traction on wet or icy surfaces.

Wet-film conditions on hard-compacted snow or ice require studs or chains.

=== Studs & studded tires ===
Many jurisdictions in Asia, Europe, and North America seasonally allow snow tires with metal or ceramic studs to improve grip on packed snow or ice. (See Regulations)

Such tires are prohibited in other jurisdictions or during warmer months because of the damage they may cause to road surfaces. The metal studs are fabricated by encapsulating a hard pin in a softer material base, sometimes called the jacket. The pin is often made of tungsten carbide, a very hard high performance ceramic. The softer base is the part that anchors the stud in the rubber of the tire. As the tire wears with use, the softer base wears so that its surface is at about the same level as the rubber, whereas the hard pin wears so that it continues to protrude from the tire. The pin should protrude at least 1 millimetre (0.04 in) for the tire to function properly. Studded tires do not eliminate skidding on ice and snow, but they greatly reduce risks.

Studdable tires are manufactured with molded holes on the rubber tire tread. Usually, there are 80 to 100 molded holes per tire for stud insertion. The insertion is done by using a special tool that spreads the rubber hole so that a stud jacket can be inserted and the flange at the bottom of the jacket can be fitted nicely to the bottom of the hole. The metal studs come in specific heights to match the depths of the holes molded into the tire tread based on the tread depths. For this reason, metal studs can be inserted only when the tires have not been driven on. A proper stud insertion results in the metal jacket that is flush with the surface of the tire tread having only the pin part that protrudes.

== Standards ==
Regardless of what conditions a tire is designed to handle, regional authorities may require minimum tread depth such as 6/32 or 3/16-inch (~4.75 mm) in the U.S. or 4 mm (~5/32in) in Europe, the use of chains, or close road access all together in freezing conditions.

=== Snow: M+S ===
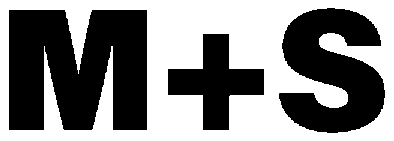
M+S mark.

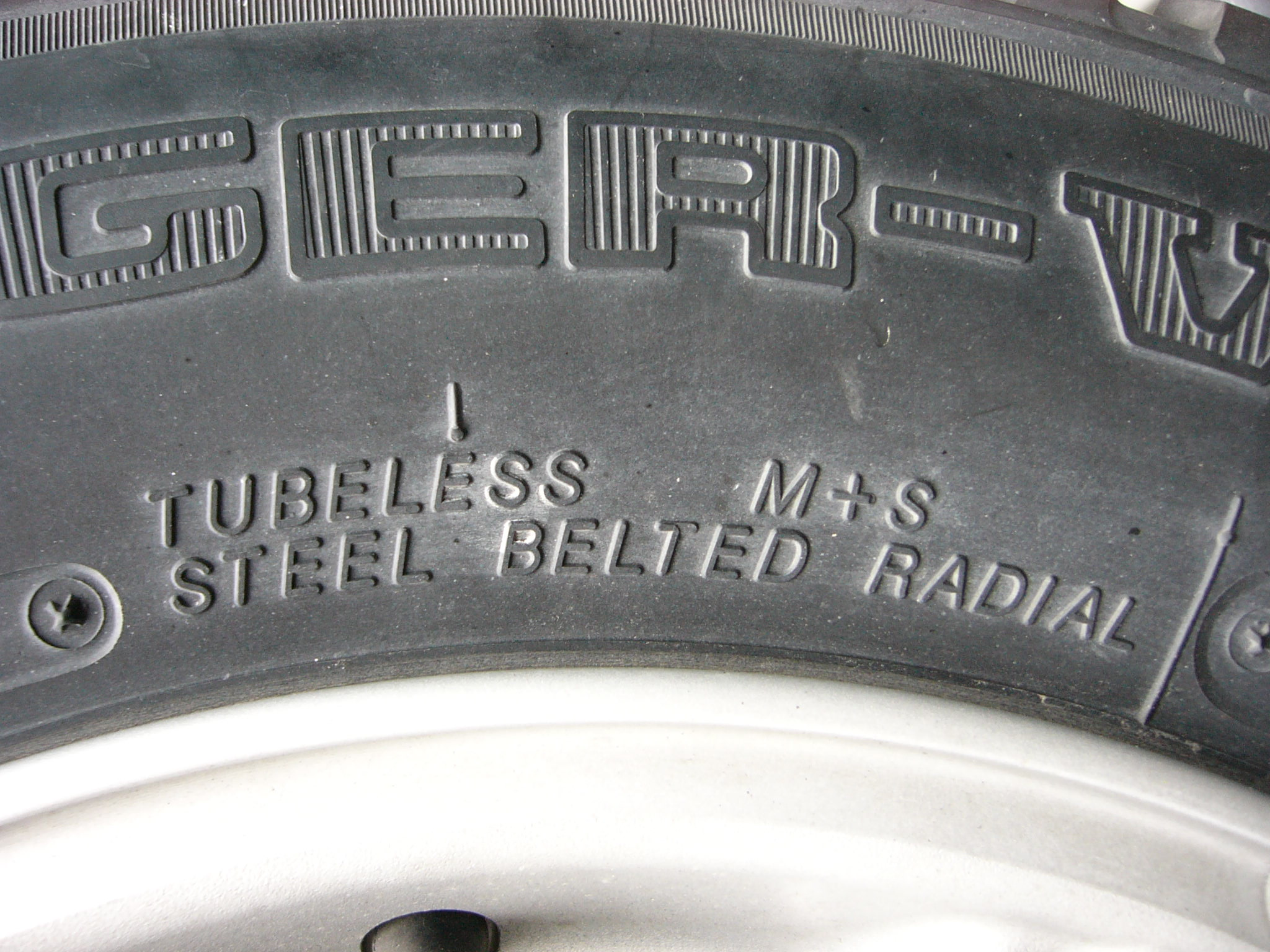
Tire sidewall bearing the M+S tire code for "Mud and Snow".

The M+S tire code arose in the 1970s to indicate tires whose tread design performs better in "Mud and Snow" conditions than regular "non-M+S" street tires, and is distinct from the tire code "M+T" for "Mud and Terrain".

The USTMA includes requirements that M+S tire tread has recesses that extend at least 1/2 inch from the edge toward the center, with a minimal cross-section of 1/16 inch, and be angled to the direction of travel from 35 to 90 degrees (perpendicular). The Tire and Rubber Association of Canada (TRAC, formerly the Rubber Association of Canada) also uses USTMA standards.

The ISO defines both "snow tyre" and "mud and snow tyre" as performing better at initiating or maintaining vehicle motion under their respective road condition versus a normal tire lacking the M+S designation or a similar combination of “M” and “S” (e.g. M&S).

UN Regulation No. 117 (UN R117) definitions and revisions have used M+S to indicate tires whose tread pattern, tread compound or structure are designed to outperform a normal tire in "mud and fresh or melting snow". Whether a tire has a "M+S marking (Y/N)" is included "grip index" test report forms. Reg. No. 172 requires a retreaded tire's sidewall to display M+S if so qualified. Currently, 68 countries have signed to UN Regulations regarding tires, the United States and Canada being the two notable exceptions which use USTMA and their respective laws.

=== Severe Snow: Alpine Symbol, 3PMSF ===
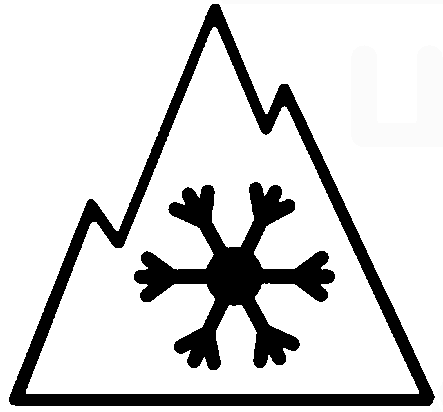
3PMSF icon.

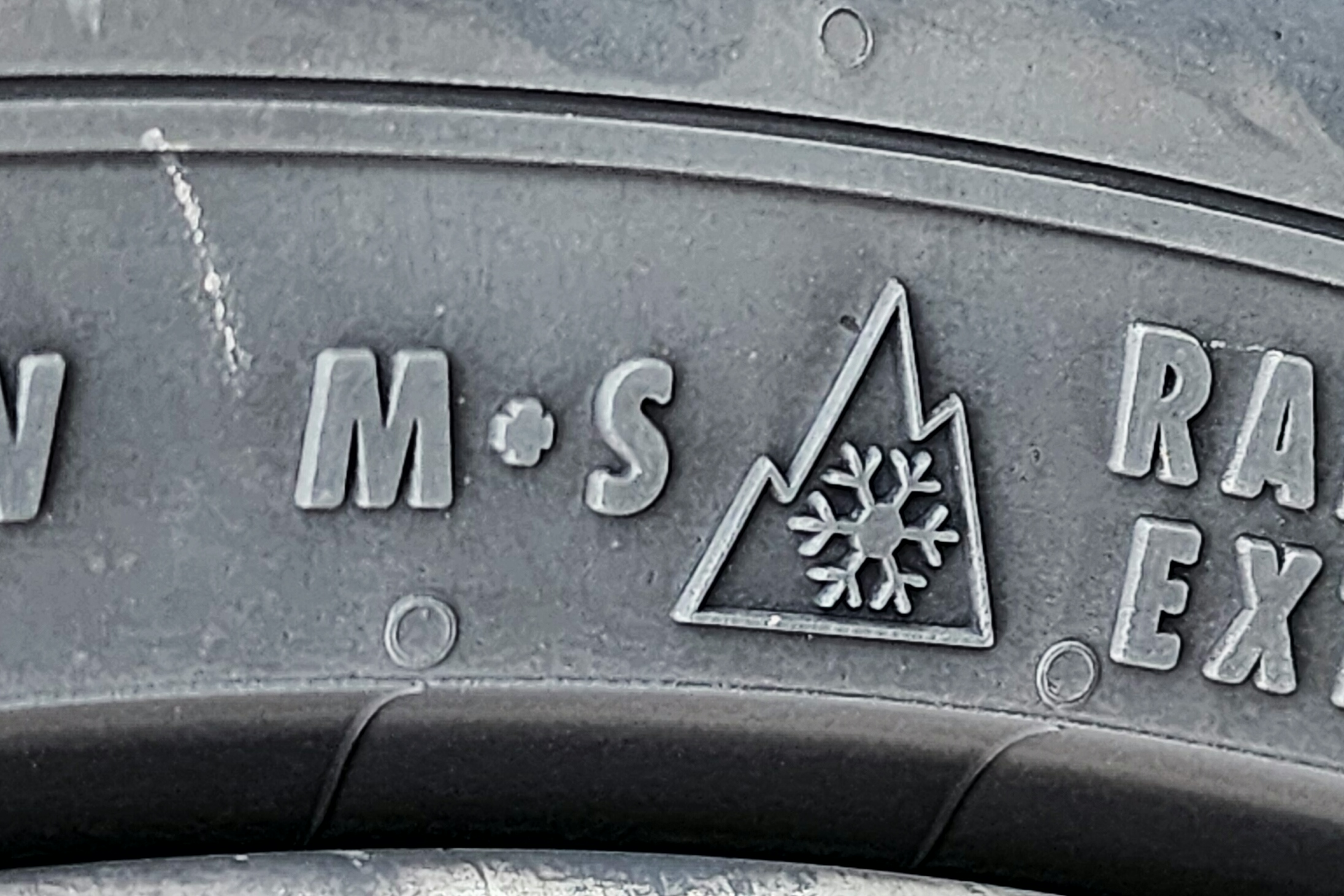
Tire sidewall bearing M+S and 3PMSF (Three Peak Mountain SnowFlake) designations.

The Alpine Symbol or Three-Peak Mountain Snow Flake (3PMSF) pictogram depicts a "mountain profile" with "three peaks with the middle peak being the tallest" containing "a six-sided snowflake" half the height of the tallest peak is an international indicator of tires of various classes rated for "severe snow use", such as a passenger vehicle tire that performs 10 to 12% better in straight-line "traction test" than a Standard Reference Test Tire (SRTT) to meet USTMA's standard. It is used in addition and adjacent to the M+S mark, and was standardized in 1999.
Snow tires should be installed on all wheels, never just the front which could lead to adverse handling.

ISO defines a "severe snow use tyre" as having a tread pattern, compound or structure whose snow grip is based on performance testing using ISO 18106 "Methods for measuring snow grip performance" to test braking on snow for passenger car and commercial vehicle tires, and acceleration on snow for truck and bus tires.

The USTMA requires the Snow Grip Index (SG) of tires for "severe snow conditions" equal or exceed that of a SRTT using straight line "traction test" ASTM F1805-18 on a medium packed snow surface. For example, with the SRTT having a SG of 1.00, a 14-inch tire would need a SG of 1.10, and a 16-inch tire a SG of 1.12, basically 10 or 12% better respectively.

UN R117 requires "severe snow" tires for a passenger car (C1) to equal or exceed a "brake test" SG of 1.07 and "traction test" SG of 1.10, while light commercial (C2) have a lesser "brake test" SG of 1.02, whereas heavy duty (C3) vehicles only "acceleration test" SG of 1.25. Whether a tire has a "3PMSF marking (Y/N)" is also included grip index test report forms. Reg. No. 172 requires a retreaded tire's sidewall to display both the 3PMSF and M+S if so qualified.

=== Ice Conditions: Ice Grip Symbol, IGS ===
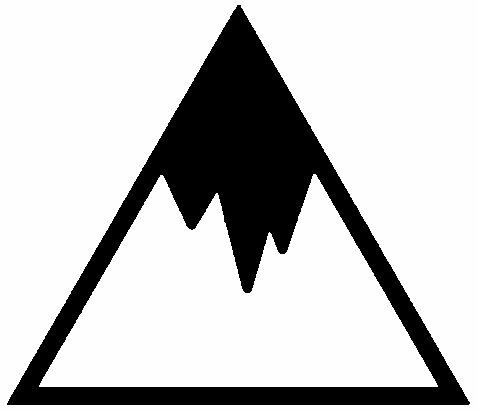
Ice Grip Symbol

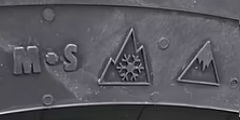
Tire sidewall bearing M+S (Mud and Snow), 3PMSF (Three Peak Mountain SnowFlake) and IGS (Ice Grip Symbol) designations.

The Ice Grip Symbol (IGS) depicting a "mountain profile" containing "three icicles with the middle icicle being the longest" is used internationally to indicate passenger car tires rated for "ice conditions" which perform at least 18% better in straight-line "braking test" than a reference tire. It is placed in addition and adjacent to both the 3PMSF mark (whose requirements it must also meet) and M+S mark, and was standardized in 2021.
Tires for "ice conditions" should be installed on all wheels, never just the front which could lead to adverse handling.

The USTMA requires the Ice Grip Index (G_{I}) of an "ice conditions" tire to equal or exceed 1.18 compared to a 16-inch tire meeting ASTM F2493 in a "braking test" complying with ISO 19447:2021.

UN R117 defines an "ice grip tyre" as 3PMSF-rated passenger car tire with a G_{I} of 1.18 or greater using the same procedures used by USTMA.

ISO's definitions of tire industry terms (2017) has yet to be updated since the release of their "ice grip performance" test methods in 2021.

=== Studded: 3PMSF with Ш ("Sha"), adding IGS ===
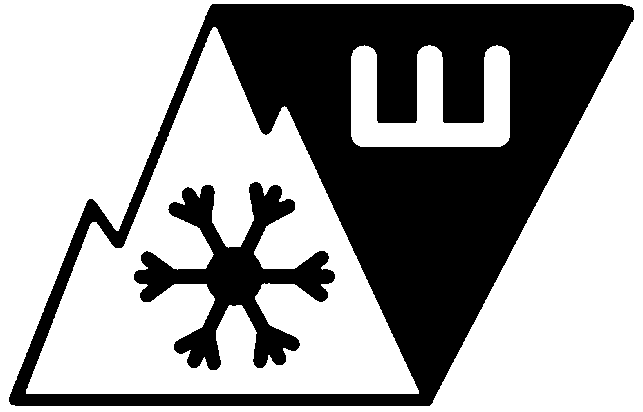
3PMSF with Ш for "Severe Snow"-rated studded tires.

A new symbol coupling the Alpine "3PMSF" symbol with the Cyrillic letter "Sha" (Ш), the first letter of studs or spikes (Russian: Шипы "shipy"; Ukrainian: Шипи "shipi"), was standardized in 2022 for studded tires that meet the requirements for "severe snow use", in addition to adding the word "STUDDED" at least 4 mm in height to the tire sidewall. Studded tires should be installed on all wheels, never just the front which could lead to adverse handling.

UN Regulation No. 164 (UN R164) was adopted in late 2022 to apply the "severe snow use" standards to studded tires, which are permitted in some regions yet were beyond the scope of UN R117. The following year, UN R164 was amended to allow studded tires that meet the requirements for a "ice grip tyre" to add the Ice Grip Symbol (IGS).

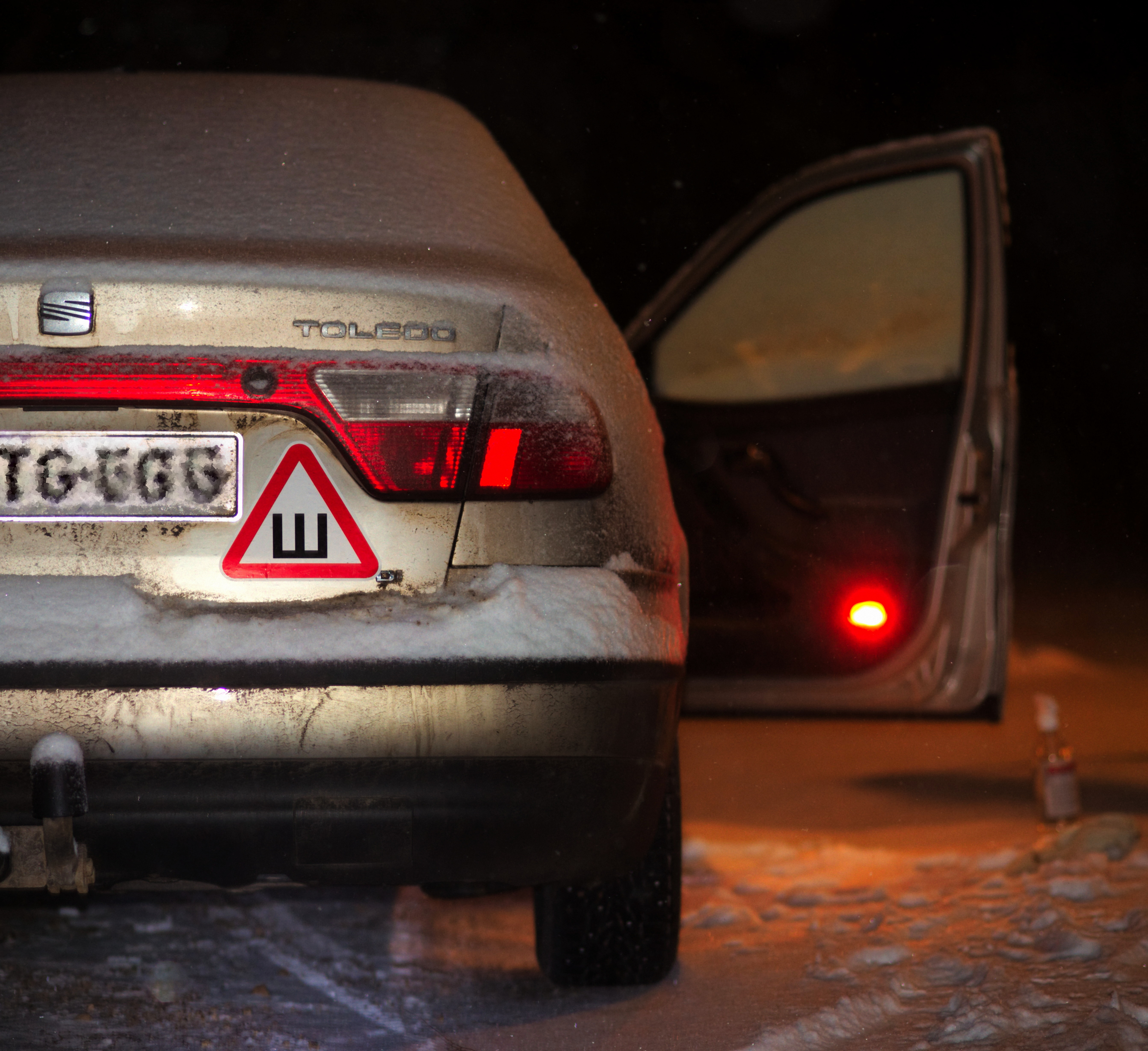
Ш in red triangle.

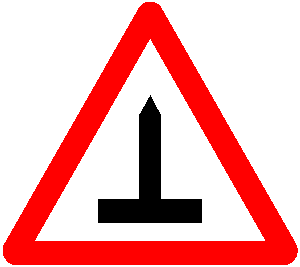
Lithuanian logo.

Austrian logo.

Whether to avoid rear-end collisions or damage from flung material, some countries have used the same Ш "Sha" in a red triangle on the rear of studded vehicles to alert following motorists (Russian law 1993-2018, Ukraine present), a similar logo (Lithuania), or a spiked tire logo (Austria).

== Regulations ==
=== Asia ===
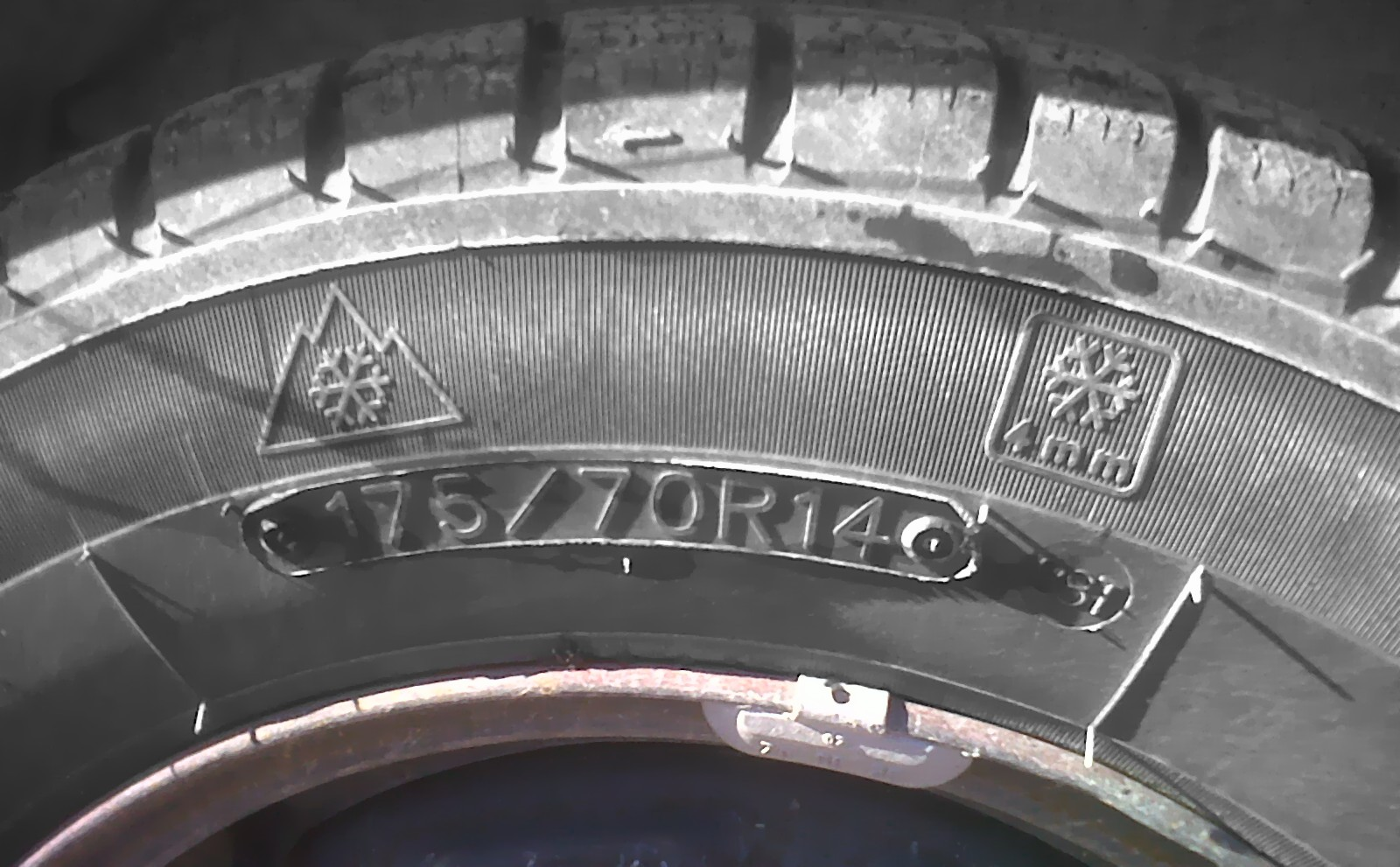
Tire with 3PMSF pictogram and a separate snow flake symbol noting "4mm" (0.16 in) minimum tread depth.

All prefectures of Japan, except for the southernmost prefecture of Okinawa, have a traffic regulation requiring motorized vehicles to be fitted with winter tires or tire chains when the road is covered by ice or snow. In addition, tire chains must be fitted for all vehicles on rural designated highways in snow country regions when regulated by traffic signs requiring tire chains.

In many prefectures, tread grooves of snow tires are worn off for more than 50% of their original depth, tires must be replaced to meet the legal requirements. Drivers will be fined for failing to comply with the snow tire or tire chains requirements, and checkpoints are in place on major highways.

Nationwide studded tire restrictions in Japan for passenger vehicles came into effect in April 1991, followed by restrictions for commercial trucks in 1993. Studded tires are still legal in Japan, but their usage is restricted by environmental law and it is a criminal offence to operate a vehicle fitted with a studded tire on dry asphalt or concrete.

=== Europe ===
European signage

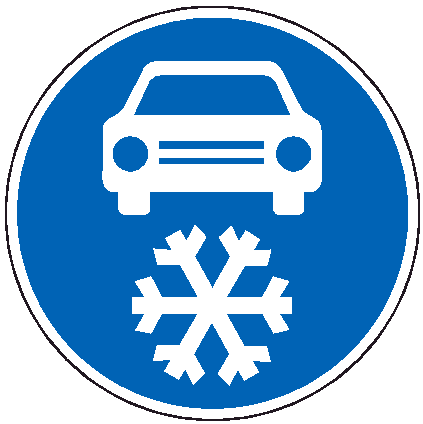
Czech sign requiring Winter equipment.

Spanish sign mandating 3PMSF tires.

French sign prohibiting snow chains.

As of 2024, regulations pertaining to snow tires in Europe varied by country. The principal aspects of regulations were whether the use was mandatory and whether studded tires were permitted.

- Snow tires mandatory between specified dates or when roads are snowy or icy: Austria, Bosnia-Herzegovina, Croatia, Czechia, Estonia, Finland, France, Germany, Latvia, Lithuania, Montenegro, Norway, Romania, Serbia, Slovakia, Slovenia, Sweden, and Russia.
- Studded tires restricted seasonally: Austria, Denmark, Estonia, Finland, France, Iceland, Ireland, Latvia, Lithuania, Norway, Russia, Spain, Sweden, and Switzerland.
- Studded tires banned: Albania, Belgium, Bosnia-Herzegovina, Bulgaria, Croatia, Czechia, Germany, Hungary, Luxembourg, North Macedonia, Montenegro, Netherlands, Poland, Portugal, Romania, Serbia, Slovakia, and Slovenia.

=== North America ===
NHTSA (United States) and Transport Canada allow the 3PMSF symbol on tires that meet or exceed the industry requirement from a reference (non-snow) tire. As of 2016, snow tires were 3.6% of the US market and 35% of the Canadian market.

==== Canada ====
Table of Canada laws: Snow tires, Snow chains, & Studded tires by province & territory
Region	Snow tires	Snow chains	Studded tires
Alberta			
British Columbia	MVAR 7.162	MVAR 7.163 - 7.1634	MVAR 7.164
Manitoba			CCSM H60 3.21(2)
National parks of Canada	CRC c1126, 40	CRC c1126, 40	
New Brunswick		MVA M17 241(3)	MVA M17 241(3)
Newfoundland and Labrador	CNLR 1007/96 27	CNLR 1007/96 27	CNLR 1007/96 28
Northwest Territories		MVER 82.(b)	MVER 82.(a)
Nova Scotia		MVA 293, 198(2)	RSNS 45/79
Nunavut		MVER 82.(b)	MVER 82.(a)
Ontario		RSO 1990 H.8 69(2)	RRO 625, 9.(1)
Prince Edward Island	"winter tires"	HTA 136.(3)	HTA WTR 1.
Quebec	C-24.2, r. 45	C-24.2, r. 44 2.	C-24.2, r. 44 1.
Saskatchewan			
Yukon			
Region	Snow tires	Snow chains	Studded tires

British Columbia sign seasonally requiring 3PMSF or M+S tires.

Federally, Transport Canada advises drivers to use winter tires on snow- or ice-covered roads. Canada’s provinces, territories, and national parks also have various winter-tire and traction requirements, which differ by date, location, weather conditions, and vehicle classification.

Quebec is the only jurisdiction that requires vehicles registered therein to have 3PMSF-rated or studded tires December 1 through March 15 regardless of weather.

==== United States ====
Table of United States laws: Snow tires, Snow chains, & Studded tires for 50 states & D.C.
Region	Snow tires	Snow chains	Studded tires
Alabama		Ala. Code 32-5-210 (2)(b)	Ala. Code 32-5-210 (2)(b)
Alaska		AS 28.35.155	AS 28.35.155
Arizona		ARS 28-958 B.2.	ARS 28-958 B.3.
Arkansas		ACA 27-37-401. (c)(2)	ACA 27-37-401. (c)(3)
California	13 CCR 1071, CVC 27459, CVC 558	CVC 27454 (a) CVC 27459 CVC 27460 CVC 27460	CVC 27454 (a) CVC 27459 CVC 27460 CVC 27460
Colorado	CRS 42-4-106 (5)(a)(I)(B)	CRS 42-4-228 (3)	CRS 42-4-228 (3)
Connecticut			CGS 14-98
Delaware			Del. Code 21-4302 (b)
Florida		FS 316.299	FS 316.299
Georgia		OCGA 32-6-5 (a)	OCGA 40-8-74 (c)(2)
Hawaii		HRS 291-33 (1)	HRS 291-33 (2)
Idaho	"snow tires"1, 2, 3	IS 49-948 (3)	IS 49-948 (3)
Illinois		625 ILCS 5/12-401 3¶	625 ILCS 5/12-401 1¶
Indiana		IC 9-19-18-3 (c)	IC 9-19-18-3 (d)
Iowa		IC 321.442 (2)	IC 321.442 (3)
Kansas		KSA 8-1742 (c)(2)	KSA 8-1742 (c)(3) KAR 36-7
Kentucky		KYRS 189.190	
Region	Snow tires	Snow chains	Studded tires
Louisiana		LRS 32:362 (B)(2)	
Maine		MRS 2381 (2)(C)	MRS 1919
Maryland	MTS 21-1119	MTS 22-405.2 (b)(2)	MTS 22-405.2 (c)
Massachusetts		idem MGL 90-16	MGL 90-16
Michigan	"winter tires"	MCL 257-710 (b)	MI Admin. Code R 247.174
Minnesota		MS 169.72 Subd. 1. (d)(2)	MS 169.72 Subd. 4.
Mississippi		MC 63-7-67	
Missouri		by cities 1, 2, 3, 4, 5	RSMo 307.171
Montana	MCA 61-9-406(3)	MCA 61-9-406(3)	MCA 61-9-406(4)
Nebraska		NRS 60-6,250 (2)(c)	NRS 60-6,250 (2)(a)
Nevada	NAC 484D.230, NRS 484D.515 (2)	NAC 484D.215 (2)(a), NRS 484D.510 (2)(a)	NAC 484D.215 (1)(e) , NRS 484D.510 (2)(c)
New Hampshire		NHRSA 266.48, NHAC Saf-C 3244.16	
New Jersey		NJRS 39:3-73	NJAC 13:20-32.19 (g)
New Mexico		NMSA 66-3-847 (C)	NMSA 66-3-847 (C)
New York	CLNY VAT 145-D	CLNY VAT 145-C	CLNY VAT 375, 35. 35-a
North Carolina		NCGS 20-122 (b)	NCGS 20-122 (b)
North Dakota		39-21-40 (3)	39-21-40 (3)
Region	Snow tires	Snow chains	Studded tires
Ohio		ORC 5589.081 (C)	ORC 5589.081 (B)(1)
Oklahoma		OSC 47-12-405 (C)(1)(b)	OSC 47-12-405 (C)(2)(b)
Oregon	OAR 734-017-0005 (1)(a)	ORS 815.140, OAR 734-017-0005	ORS 815.165 (7), OAR 734-017-0005
Pennsylvania	67 PaC 213.2	75 PaCSA 4525 (d)	75 PaCSA 4525 (c)
Rhode Island		RIGL 31-23-20 (3)	RIGL 31-23-20 (1)
South Carolina		SCCLU 56-5-5040	SCCLU 56-5-5040
South Dakota		SDCL 32-19-2	SDCL 32-19-3
Tennessee		TC 55-9-106 (c)	TC 55-9-106 (b)
Texas		TTC 547.612 (c)(2)	
Utah	UAC R920-6	UCA 41-6a-1636 (5)(c)	UCA 41-6a-1636 (5)(a)
Vermont	"snow tires"		23 VSA 1092
Virginia		CoV 46.2-1044	CoV 46.2-1044
Washington	WAC 204-24-040 (3)(d)	WAC 204-24-050, RCW 46.37.420 (2)	RCW 46.37.420 (2)
Wash., D.C.		DCMR 18-732.5(b)	DCMR 18-732.5(c)
West Virginia		WVC 17C-15-37 (c)(2)	WVC 17C-15-37 (c)(3)
Wisconsin		WS 347.45 (2)(b)	WS 347.45 (2)(c)
Wyoming	WS 31-5-956 (e)	WS 31-5-956 (c)(ii)	WS 31-5-956 (c)(iii)
Region	Snow tires	Snow chains	Studded tires

Some U.S. states, especially those in snowy or mountainous regions, require certain vehicles to use approved winter tires or carry traction devices such as tire chains. when traveling on designated roads during the winter season. Where allowed, studded tires and similar traction devices are usually restricted to specific months to prevent road damage. Requirements can vary widely by jurisdiction and may also depend on vehicle class, axle configuration, weight, and other factors.

== See also ==
- Snow chains
- Snow socks
