= Allissa Impink =

American politician

Member-elect of the Indiana Senate from the 46th district
- Assuming office November 4, 2026
- Succeeding: Andrea Hunley

Personal details
- Born: Indianapolis, Indiana
- Party: Democratic
- Education: University of Louisville (BS); Martin University (MS); Marian University (MAT)

Allissa M. Impink is an American politician who is a member-elect of the Indiana Senate from the 46th District. She also served as a Commissioner on the Board of Indianapolis Public Schools from District 4 from January 2025 to June 2026. Impink ran to succeed Andrea Hunley, who retired to run for mayor of Indianapolis in 2027.

== Early life and education ==
Impink was born and raised in Indianapolis, Indiana. She graduated from the University of Louisville with a Bachelor of Science in sociology, from Martin University with a Master of Science in community psychology, and Marian University with a Master of Arts in Teaching.
