= Snow socks =

Devices fitted to the tires of vehicles

Snow socks (also known as auto socks) are textile alternatives to snow chains. Snow sock devices wrap around the tires of a vehicle to increase traction on snow and ice. Snow socks are normally composed of a woven fabric with an elastomer attached to the inner and/or outer edge. The woven fabric covers the tire tread and is the contact point between the vehicle and the road. The elastomer keeps the snow sock in place and facilitates installation. Some snow sock models have an additional component that covers the rim of the tire, which prevents snow or debris from gathering between the tread of the tire and the inner side of the woven fabric.

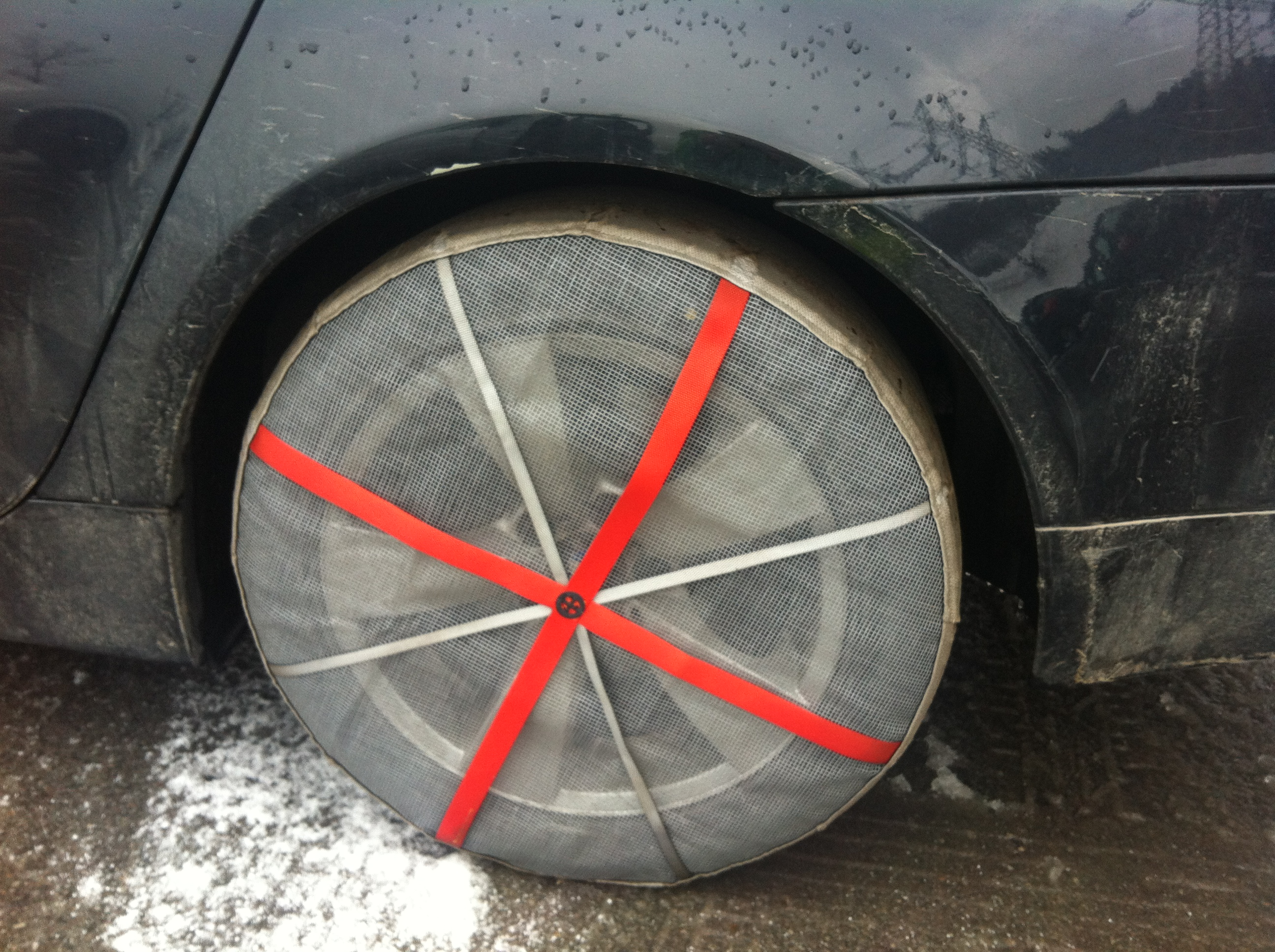
Snow sock

== Sizing and deployment ==
Snow socks are sold in pairs and come in sizes that are specific to a range of tire codes. Snow sock sizes are available for different motor vehicle classes, but most snow sock brands focus on cars and pickup trucks rather than semi-trailer trucks or larger vehicles. Since the largest variation of snow socks is in the market for cars and pickup trucks, wide or low-profile tires are often covered. Buses, semi-trailer trucks or larger vehicles require snow sock models that can support the heavier axle load and larger wheel dimensions. Some brands also offer snow socks for specialized vehicles such as forklifts or airport ground support equipment (e.g. pushback tugs or loaders).

Driving with snow socks usually reduces the maximum allowable speed to between 30 km/h (20 mph) and 50 km/h (30 mph) depending on the snow sock brand, snow sock size and vehicle class. These restrictions are normally stated in the product's or vehicle's owner’s manual. Neither snow socks nor snow chains are considered direct substitutes to snow tires.

== Legality of use ==
During inclement weather, regions may invoke snow chain laws as a precautionary measure. Snow socks are generally not considered a legal equivalent to snow chains, though some brands are individually approved.

If snow chains are prohibited, snow socks without metal components may be permitted. This depends on local legislature.

== Textile snow socks ==
This is a cover in textile that covers the tire and insulates the tire from snow. They do not disturb safety systems (ABS, ESP) or damage aluminum rims.

One important component is polyester. The fibres absorb the water and improve grip. They have been used safely up to 50 km/h (30 mph).

== Snow socks made of composite materials ==
Michelin manufactures a composite snow sock called Easy Grip. It is coupled with an inner elastic band to facilitate installation. To strengthen the tread and maximize road holding there are 150 galvanised steel rings.

== Benefits of snow socks ==
Snow socks offer added benefit in that they do not disturb the safety systems on a vehicle such as ESP or ABS. Snow socks with a high polyester count absorb more surface water from the road improving grip and allowing driving at speeds up to 50 km/h (30 mph).

== See also ==
- Snow chains
- Snow tire
