= Connie Sipes =

American politician

Member of the Indiana Senate from the 46th district
- In office 1997 - 2011
- Preceded by: Kathy Smith
- Succeeded by: Ron Grooms

Personal details
- Born: August 6, 1949 (age 77) New Albany, Indiana
- Party: Democratic
- Spouse: Stephan L.
- Education: Indiana University Southeast
- Profession: Principal of Fairmont Elementary School in New Albany

Connie Lou Weigleb Sipes is a former Democratic member of the Indiana Senate, representing the 46th District from 1997 to 2011.
