= Ron Grooms =

American politician (born 1944)

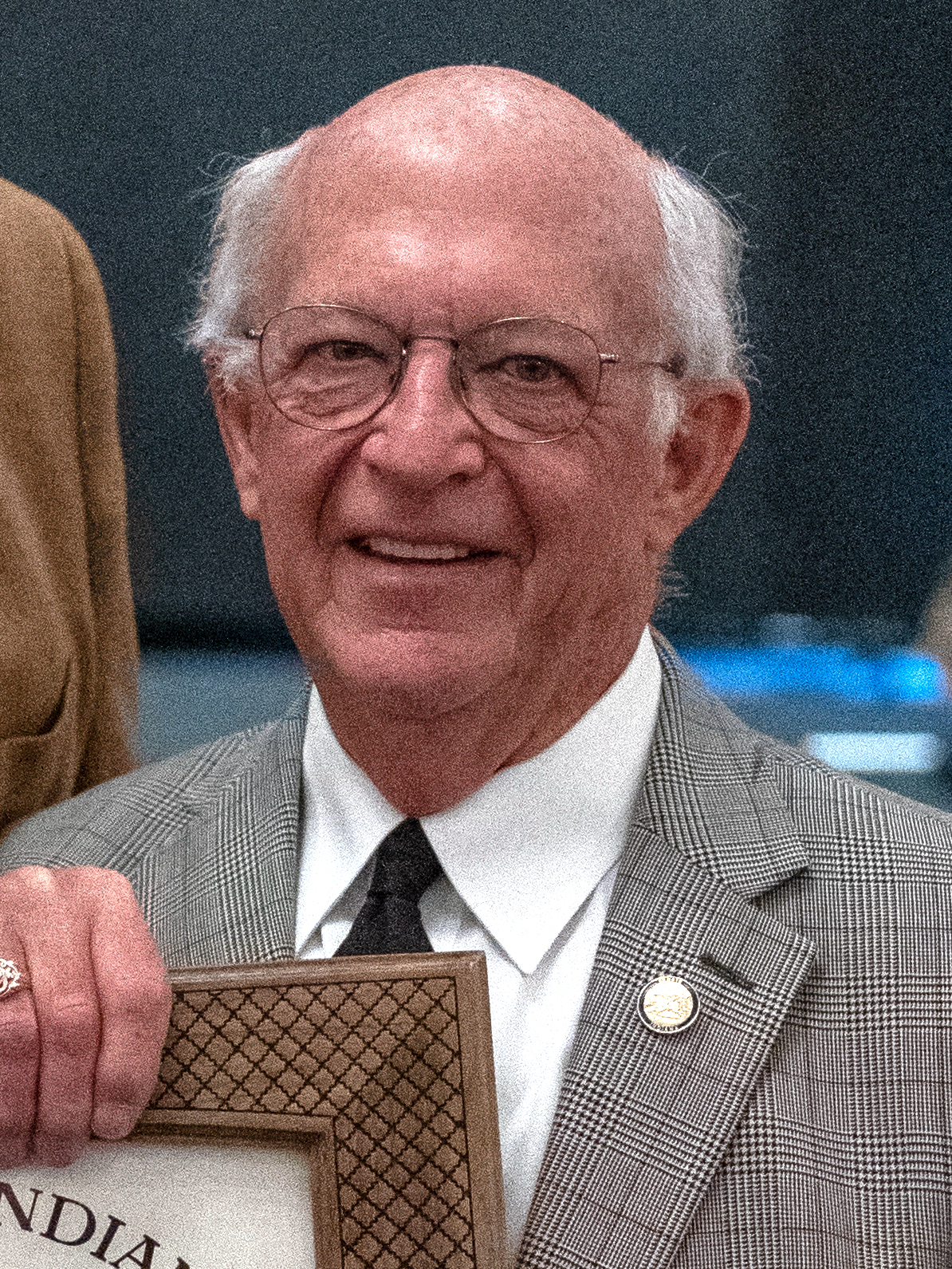

Member of the Indiana Senate from the 46th district
- In office 2011–2021
- Preceded by: Connie Sipes
- Succeeded by: Kevin Boehnlein

Personal details
- Born: May 15, 1944 (age 82)
- Party: Republican
- Education: Butler University (PharmB)
- Profession: Pharmacist

Ronald T. Grooms (born May 15, 1944) is an American politician and pharmacist who served as a member of the Indiana Senate for the 46th district from 2011 to 2021.

== Early life, education and career ==
Grooms graduated from Lizton High School in 1962 and received a Bachelor of Pharmacy degree from Butler University in 1967.

== Career ==
Grooms works as a pharmacist for Super X Drugs and Clark Memorial Hospital before owning his own pharmacy from 1969 to 2006. Grooms served on the Jeffersonville City Council from 1984 to 1992, and again from 2000 until 2011. In 2006, Grooms worked as a fundraising coordinator for Congressman Mike Sodrel. He was also an advisor to State Representative Richard B. Wathen.

=== Indiana Senate ===
Grooms was elected to the Indiana Senate in 2010, very narrowly defeating County Commissioner Chuck Freiburger to take the seat held by retiring Democrat Connie Sipes. In 2014, Grooms successfully ran for reelection, besting Freiberger again. In 2018, Grooms again successfully ran for reelection, this time against Democratic challenger Anna Murray.

Grooms resigned from the Indiana Senate in November 2021.

== Personal ==
Grooms has two daughters and is divorced.
