= Siping (rubber) =

Process to improve rubber's traction

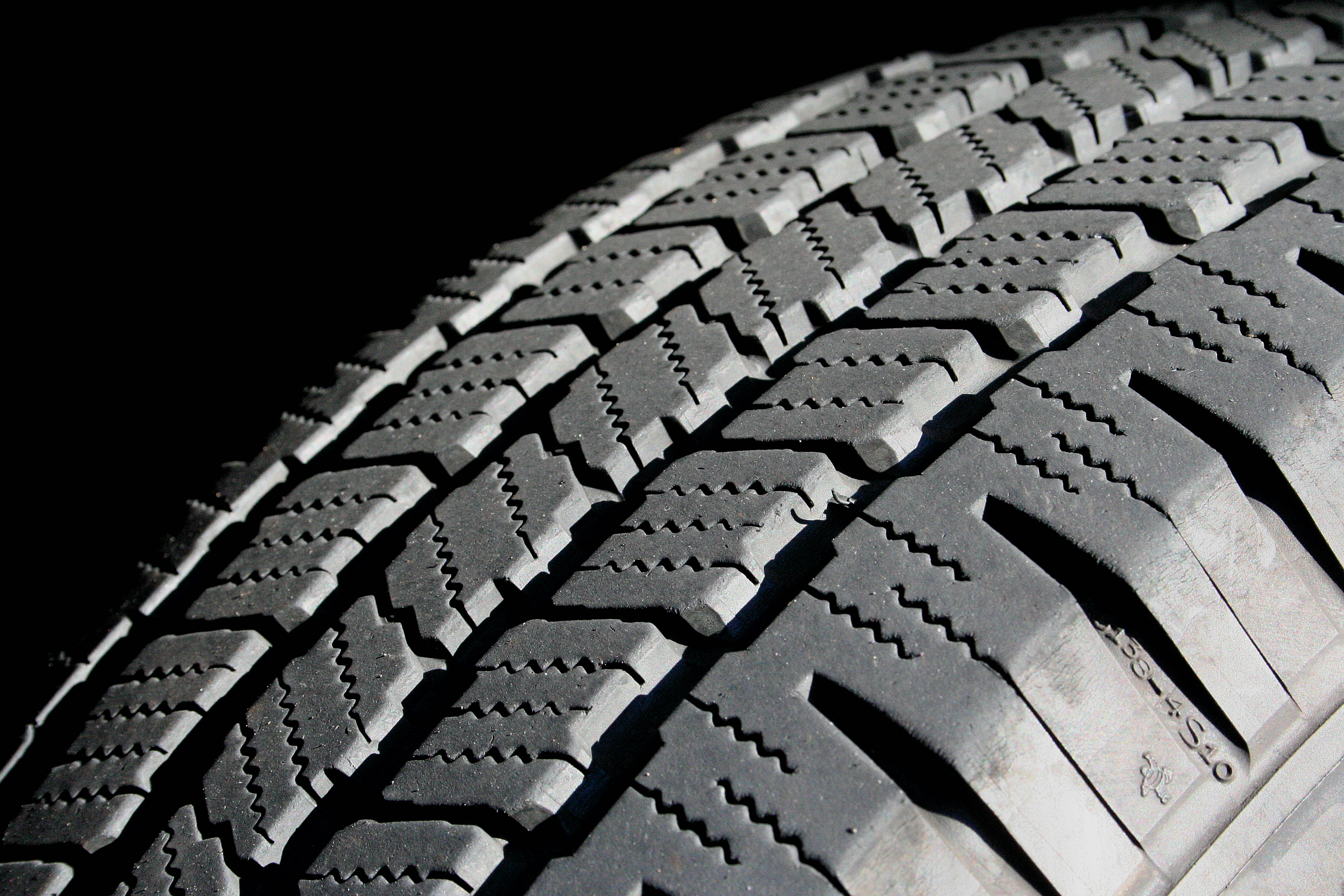
Zigzag sipes on tire tread

Siping is a process of cutting thin slits across a rubber surface to improve traction in wet or icy conditions.

Siping was invented and patented in 1923 under the name of John F. Sipe. The story told on various websites is that, in the 1920s, Sipe worked in a slaughterhouse and grew tired of slipping on the wet floors. He found that cutting slits in the tread on the bottoms of his shoes provided better traction than the uncut tread. Another story is that he was a deckhand and wanted to avoid slipping on a wet deck.

== Tires ==
John Sipe's invention was unsuccessful. It was applied to solid rubber tires, rather than pneumatic tires, and so the tires had poor wet grip anyway, owing to their limited contact patch. It was his son, Harry E. Sipe, who popularised the use of sipes in the US for the new low-pressure balloon tires around 1939.

The process was not applied to vehicle tires on a large scale until the 1950s, when superior tread compounds were developed that could stand up to the siping process. On roads covered with snow, ice, mud, and water, sipes usually increase traction. A US patent to Goodyear also claimed sipes improve tire traction, and tend to close completely in the tire "footprint" on the road. A 1978 study by the US National Safety Council found siping improved stopping distances by 22 percent, breakaway traction by 65 percent, and rolling traction by 28 percent on glare ice. Since then, the council has retracted that study and is "not currently recommending or endorsing the siping procedure".

Tire tread block shapes, groove configurations, and sipes affect tire noise pattern and traction characteristics. Typically, wide, straight grooves have a low noise level and good water removal. More lateral grooves usually increase traction. Sipes are small grooves that are cut across larger tread elements. Up to a point, more sipes give more traction in snow or mud.

As is often the case, there are compromises. Winter tires, and "mud and snow" tires, may have thousands of sipes and give good traction, but they may feel "squirmy" on a warm, dry road. Unpatterned racing "slicks" on dry roads give maximum traction. These have no sipes, no grooves, and no tread blocks. However, they have very poor traction on even slightly wet surfaces. Large sipes are usually built into the tread during manufacturing. Sipes may also be cut into the tread at a later date, called "microsiping". Bandag developed a machine for microsiping which places a curved knife blade at a slight angle on a rotating drum. The drum is placed so when it is pressed against the tread the tire is pressed into an exaggerated hollow, as if driving down a rail. The drum is lubricated and rotated and the knife makes a series of diagonal cuts across the tread. For improved traction, the tire may be siped twice, leaving diamond-shaped blocks. A significant problem with field siping is that the tread picks up rocks, glass, and other hard road debris in use, and even with thorough cleaning the knife service life is often poor.

Microsiping can dramatically improve tire traction in rain and snow. However, microsiped tires may also have increased road noise and tire wear when operated on dry surfaces. Consumer Reports recommends against adding more than "the sipes that your tires come with" because of longevity and dry performance. Some companies such as Les Schwab claim that microsiped tires reduce tire friction heat and tire wear and extends the life of the tire.

Both Bridgestone and Michelin sell snow tires that are siped at the factory, while Saf-Tee Siping and Grooving sells machines that can sipe most standard vehicle tires. Siping can also be done by hand. Siping tires may void the manufacturer's warranty. Claims that extended life is achieved by siping may only apply to certain environments, operating temperatures, and rubber compound builds.

=== Use in racing tires ===
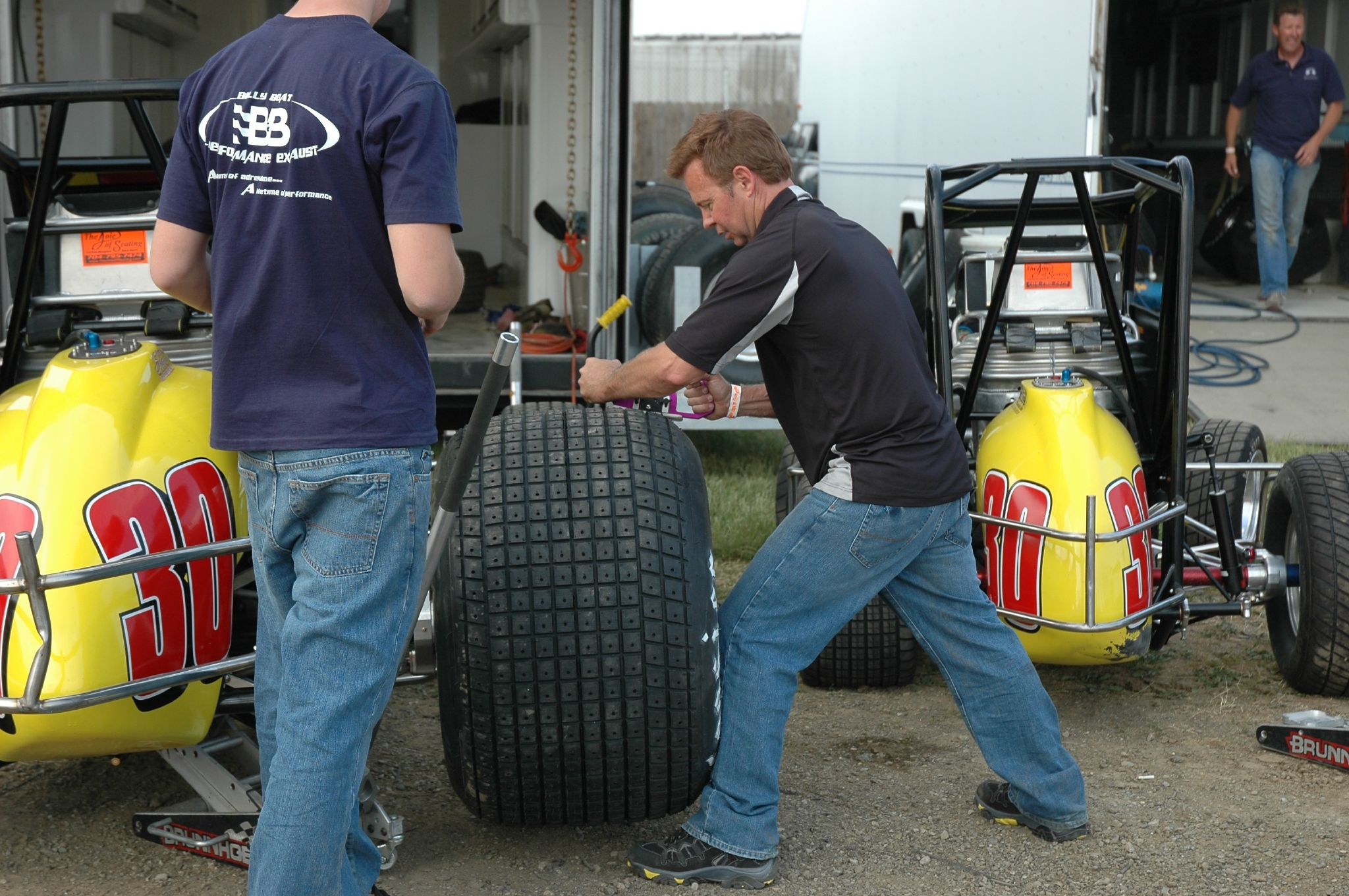
William "Billy" Boat siping a sprint car tire

Fine slits are cut into the tire with a narrow blade, not near the size of a groove. Racing tires are siped to increase speed. The increased traction allows better contact to the racing surface for increased braking, acceleration, and turning. The sipes allow the tire to heat quicker at the start of their use and cool quicker.

== Boat shoes ==
Siped soles are a characteristic feature of boat shoes.
