= Cycle speedway =

Form of bicycle racing on short oval dirt tracks

Cycle speedway is a form of bicycle racing on short oval dirt tracks, usually outdoors, occasionally indoors, typically 70–90 metres long. Like motorcycle speedway, riders use machines without brakes or multiple gears but, unlike motor speedway, the object is not to slide bikes round the turns.

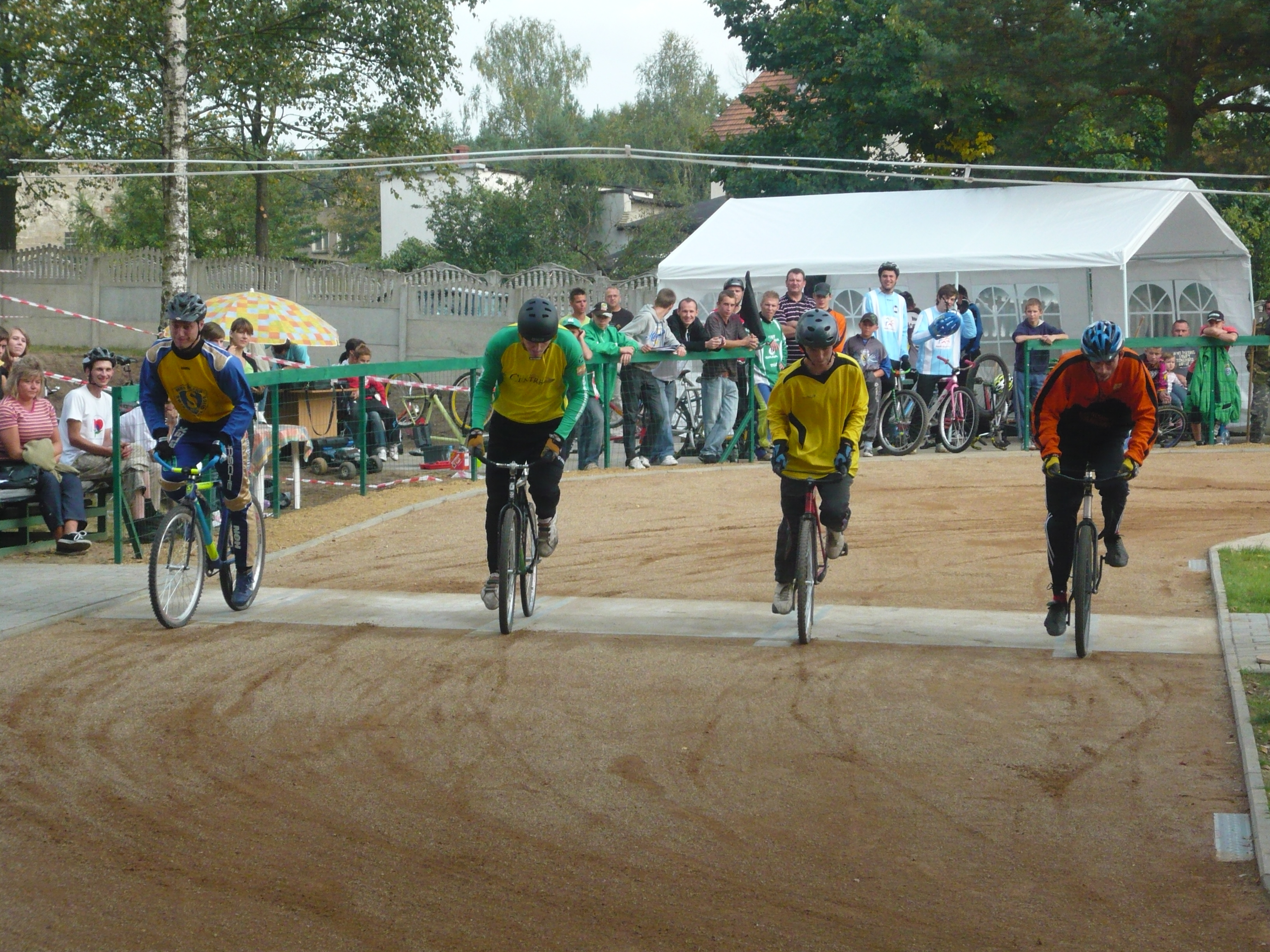
Gate during tournament in Kalety, Poland

== Origins ==
The origins of cycle speedway are obscure. It existed by the 1920s but appears to have taken off in the wreckage of post-war cities in Britain. With tracks cleared through the rubble, on bikes not otherwise roadworthy, and under the influence of motorcycle speedway, cycle speedway grew haphazardly as a way for young people to enjoy themselves in cities.

London, with most bomb sites, led in organising races, in 1945. There were more than 200 clubs in East London by 1950, with more than 20 in Walthamstow alone. The sport spread across the country. The Birmingham league had 22 teams in its first season. Coventry, Leicester, Wolverhampton and Cradley Heath followed.

Intercity matches began in 1946. They were hampered by inconsistent rules, a problem resolved with the formation in 1950 of the National Amateur Cycle Speedway Association (NACSA). Consistent rules opened the way to national competitions and championships and then to international tournaments.

Ten thousand watched the first international between England and the Netherlands at the Empress Hall, Earls Court, London on 26 October 1950. The sport then declined as bomb sites were cleared and potential riders were drafted into the armed forces for National Service; cycle speedway once more became a local enthusiasm and many clubs closed.

Enthusiasts tried to revive the sport in 1958 and organised a tournament billed as a world championship, with riders from the Netherlands, Sweden and Poland. The sport then became divided by an administrative civil war, a situation resolved with the formation in 1971 of the British Cycle Speedway Council.

== Modern administration ==
Today the sport is managed and administered by British Cycling, the governing body for all cycle sport in the UK except individual and team time trials. A management committee, the Cycle Speedway Commission, advises on racing rules and competitions. All cycle speedway riders and referees are required to be members of British Cycling, and in return are covered by their comprehensive insurance policies.

UK competitions are run annually, world championships biannually, alternating with the European championships. There are approximately 40 clubs in the UK.

== Races ==
Cycle speedway is raced by individuals, pairs or teams. Each race is contested by up to four riders, and a match normally consists of eight to twenty-four races. Points are awarded for placings in each race. A race day fixture might take in up to two, three or more matches. In a team event, the winning team is the one with most points at the end of the day.

Races involve up to four riders racing anticlockwise round four laps of the track, the winner being the first across the line. The number of laps varies with the age of the riders but is usually 4 laps for a single race. Competitors use a lightweight single-speed bicycle equipped with a freewheel but without brakes, often a stripped-down mountain bike frame is adequate for beginners although specialist machines are used by the top racers. Riders slide their left foot along the track as they race round turns. Physical contact is legal and often necessary; clothing usually covers the whole body from the neck down, with padding for knees, elbows and hips; helmets are also required since their introduction in 1999. There has never been an accident in cycle speedway resulting in serious injury or death.

== The bike ==
Cycle speedway bikes are simple and robust. Steel and aluminium still rule in cycle-speedway. No suspension, upright handlebars, a low, single gear with a freewheel and 26 inch wheels (ETRTO:590) with heavily treaded tyres. They are purpose-built for getting through a cycle speedway race as fast as possible and doing so in one piece.

=== Tyre and inner tube ===
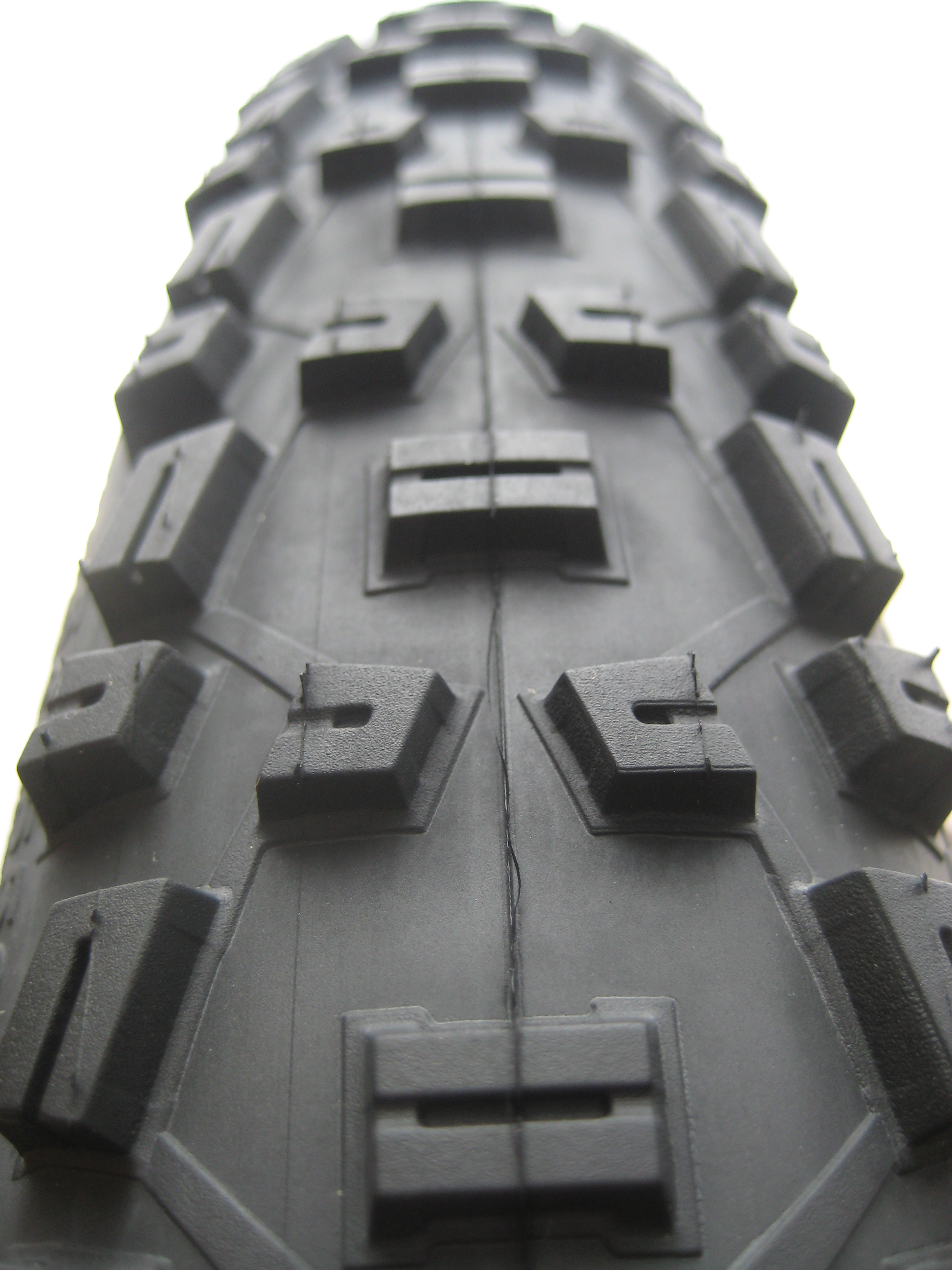
Off-road tire

Tyre widths below 26 × 1 3/8 (ETRTO:35-590, French:650x35A) were popular in the past, current tyres tend to be available from 30-35 (ETRTO:590, French:650A) width 32 and 34 with Schrader valve type tube being the most common. Often a stripped-down mountain bike tyre 27.5 × 1.35 (ETRTO:35-584, French:650x35B) is used by those just starting out in the sport.

=== Components ===
==== Cycle chain ====
The roller chain is used 1/2 × 1/8 same size as single-speed bike or single speed city bike.

== Indoor races ==
Races are sometimes held in sports halls and other venues. The events are the same but the solid and smooth surface makes speeds higher. A sectional track is taken around sports centres in Britain for national events. Centre sections are added or removed to fit locations.

== International aspect ==
Countries affiliated to the International Cycle Speedway Federation include England, Scotland, Wales, Poland, Australia, the Netherlands and the United States. Cycle speedway also exists in Sweden, Ukraine and Russia. Riders from other countries including Austria, Germany and Malta have tried cycle speedway, and Ireland is regularly represented at full international level.

Many of the sport's international riders go on to compete in other competition. Olympic gold medalist Brett Aitken is arguably the sport's most famous expert, with European gold medallist Jess Varnish linked to the sport through her father James 'Jim' Varnish who was World Cycle Speedway Champion in 1985.

== See also ==
- Hybrid bicycle
- Cyclo-cross bicycle
- Keirin
- Inoue Rubber
