= Tire tread =

Rubber on the circumference of a tire that contacts the ground

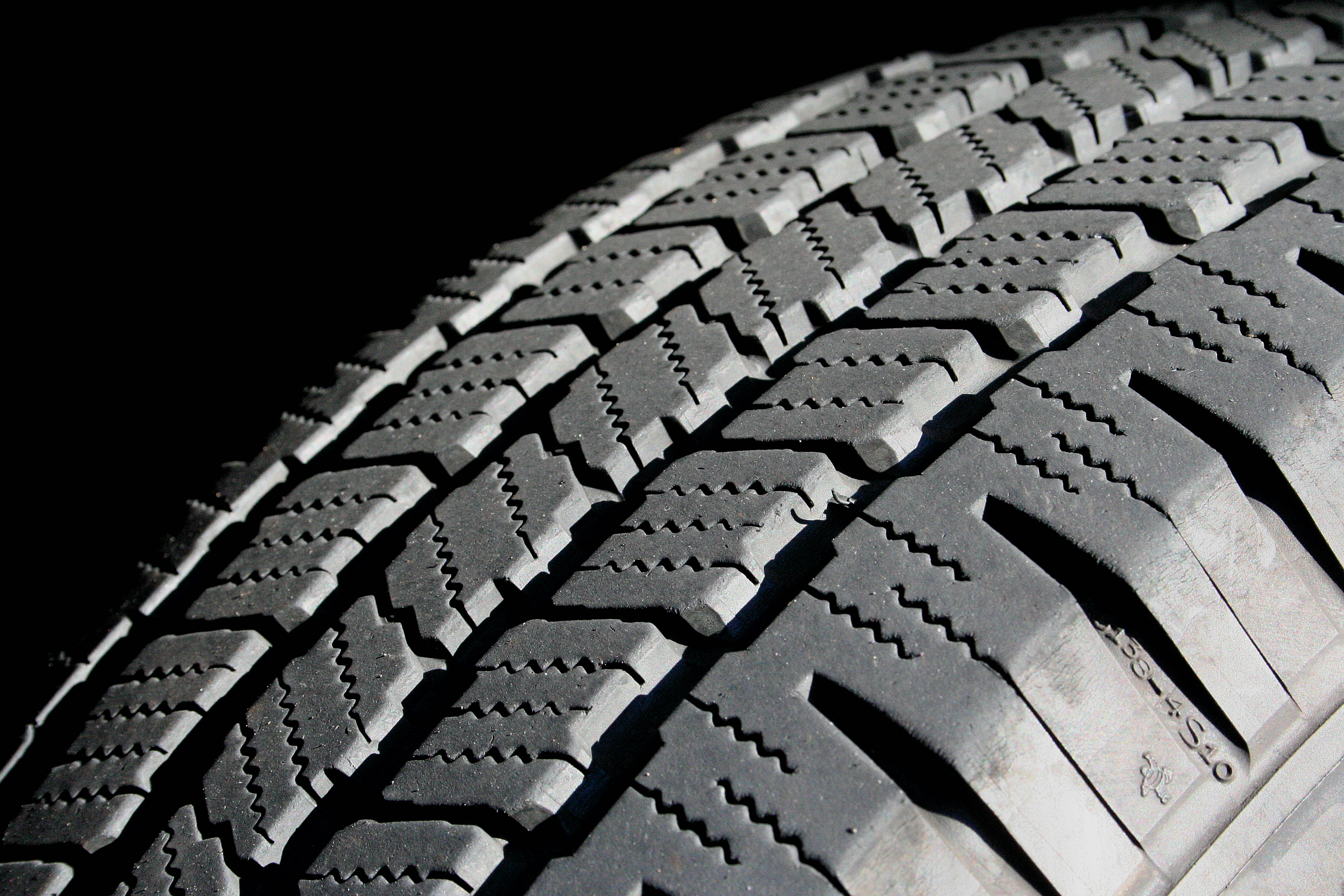
Tire tread

The tread of a tire or track refers to the rubber on its circumference that makes contact with the road or the ground. As tires are used, the tread is worn off, limiting its effectiveness in providing traction. A worn tire can often be retreaded.

The word tread is often used casually to refer to the pattern of grooves molded into the rubber, but those grooves are correctly called the tread pattern, or simply the pattern. The grooves are not the tread, they are in the tread. This distinction is especially significant in the case of racing slicks, which have much tread but no grooves.

== Tires ==
Common tire tread pattern.

=== Street tires ===
The grooves in the rubber are designed to allow water to be expelled from beneath the tire and prevent hydroplaning. The proportion of rubber to air space on the road surface directly affects its traction. Design of tire tread has an effect upon noise generated, especially at freeway speeds. Generally there is a tradeoff of tread friction capability; deeper patterns often enhance safety, but simpler designs are less costly to produce and actually may afford some roadway noise mitigation. Tires intended for dry weather use will be designed with minimal pattern to increase the contact patch. Tires with a smooth tread (i.e., having no tread pattern) are known as slicks and are generally used for racing only, since they are quite dangerous if the road surface is wet.

Street tires will also include wear limit indicators in the form of small raised bridges within the grooves. When the tread is worn down enough that the limit indicators make contact with the road, the tire is deemed to be at the end of its service life. Brake pads use similar indicators in the form of notches on their surface that disappear when they are used.

=== Snow tires ===
Snow tires or Winter tires are tires designed for use in colder weather, snow and ice. To improve traction, they are made of different rubber and have a different tread pattern from regular street tires.

=== Off-road tires ===
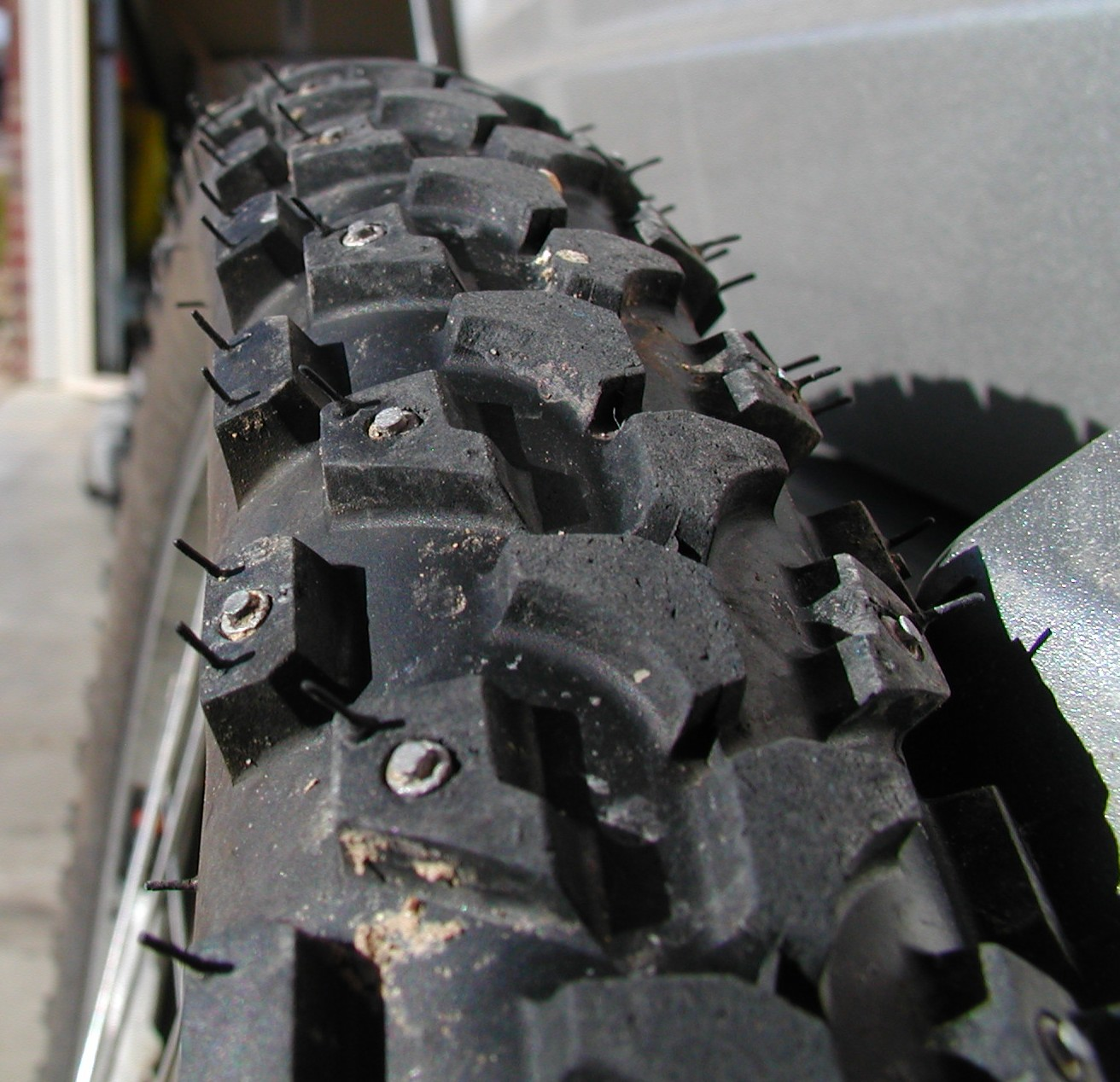
Studded mountain bike tires for icy conditions.

Off-road tires used in mud or dirt feature individual knob patterns to allow the tire to bite into the surface and lever the sides of the tread to get a better grip. Given the smaller contact patch, these tires tend to wear quickly when used on asphalt (depending on type of rubber).

=== Mountain bike and motorcycle tires ===
Mountain bike and some motorcycle tires feature tread similar to off-road tires used on cars and trucks but may sometimes include an unbroken tread that runs along its center. This feature provides better traction and lower noise on asphalt at high speed and on high tire pressure, but retains the ability to provide grip on a soft or loose surface- lower tire pressure or soft ground will cause the side lugs to come into contact with the surface. Road bike tires may have shallow grooves for aesthetic purposes, but such grooves are unnecessary in narrow applications.

== Continuous tracks ==
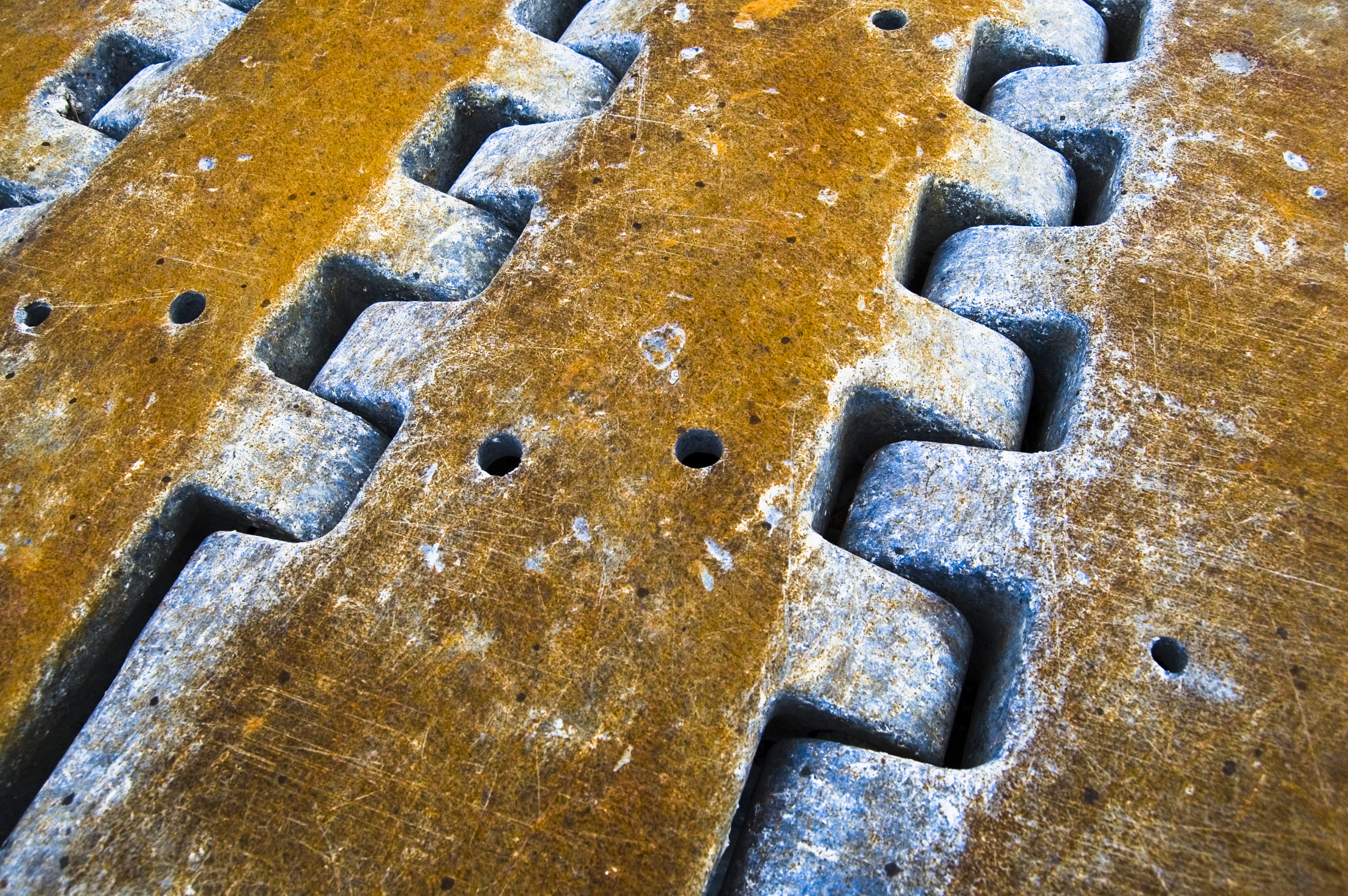
The tread of a construction machine's tracks.

Continuous tracks such as those used on military tanks or construction machines (i.e. caterpillar tracks) have metal track segments which may be rubber-coated. They usually do not feature tread patterns, because these would offer little additional grip given the weight of the tracked vehicle. Traction is usually provided by grousers instead.

== See also ==
- Anti-lock braking system
- Bar grip
- Forensic tire tread evidence
- Snow chains
- Traction vector
- Traction control system
- Treadwear rating
