= South Pole–Queen Maud Land Traverse =

Scientific Expedition

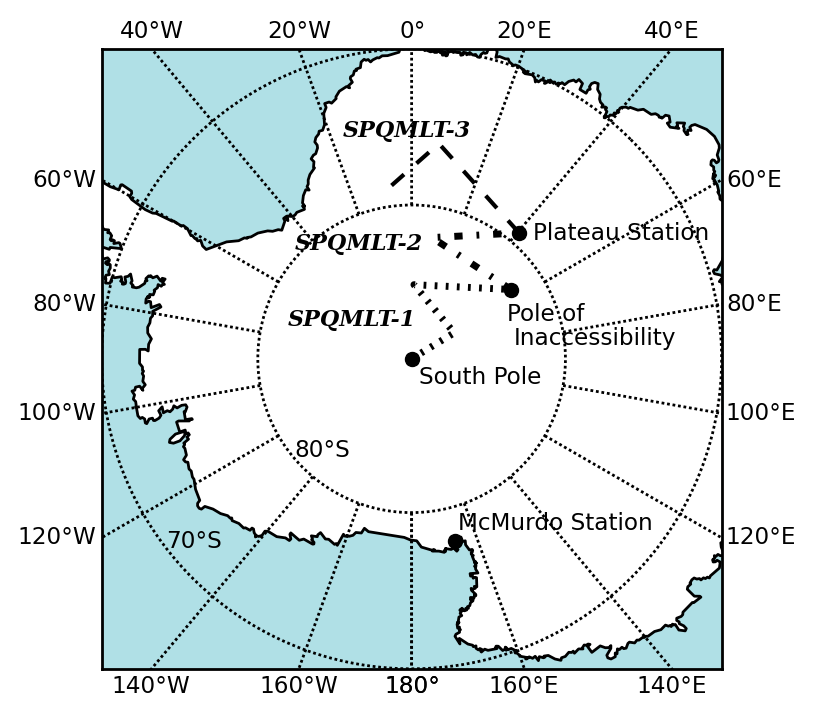
Map of Antarctica showing route of the South Pole–Queen Maud Land Traverse (1964–1968)

The South Pole–Queen Maud Land Traverse was a three-part scientific expedition that explored largely uncharted regions of Antarctica. Conducted by the United States in the 1960s, the expedition comprised three traverses, designated South Pole–Queen Maud Land Traverse I, II, and III (SPQMLT-1, -2, and -3). The traverses followed a zigzag route across nearly 4,200 km of the Antarctic Plateau during the austral summers of 1964–1965, 1965–1966, and 1967–1968, respectively. In addition to scientists from the United States, the expeditions included scientists from Norway and Belgium. This article comprises the following three sections:

- Features common to all three traverses: SPQMLT-1, SPQMLT-2, and SPQMLT-3.
- Activities and results of each traverse.
- Overall scientific results.

== Features Common to All Three Traverses: SPQMLT-1, SPQMLT-2, and SPQMLT-3. ==
=== Personnel ===
Each traverse was staffed by seven or eight scientists and two or three engineers. Participants were affiliated with the following institutions:

- University of Wisconsin
- The Ohio State University
- U.S. Coast and Geodetic Survey
- Norwegian Polar Institute
- Free University of Brussels

=== Objectives ===
The objectives included:

- determining the thickness of the Antarctic Ice Sheet;
- determining the elevation and slope of its surface;
- determining the rate of ice accumulation;
- determining the subglacial topography;
- measuring the density and temperature of the ice at depth;
- measuring the geomagnetic field and gravity; and
- obtaining snow samples and ice cores.

=== Logistics ===
The traverses used the following logistical equipment and support:

- Vehicles: Three diesel-powered Tucker Sno-Cats, one of which was equipped with a drilling rig.
- Communication: Each vehicle carried a Collins KWM-2 high-performance vacuum-tube radio HF transceiver for communication with the other vehicles and with Antarctic research stations.
- Surface transport: Diesel fuel was carried in large low-pressure rubber Rolligon tires, while other supplies were transported on several 1-ton and 2-ton sleds.
- Resupply: Fuel and supplies were replenished by mid-route airdrops from U.S. Navy LC-130 aircraft operating under Operation Deep Freeze.
- Navigation: En route course corrections were made using solar and magnetic compasses.

=== Measurements Made En Route ===
Two of the Sno-Cats carried several altimeters and a proton magnetometer, and traveled in tandem with one vehicle maintaining an 8 km lead over the other. Every 8 km, the vehicles stopped to make simultaneous altimeter and magnetometer readings, as well as measurements of gravity, surface slope, snow density, and weather conditions.

The surface slope was measured by scanning the horizon with a theodolite and recording the azimuth and vertical angles of the highest and lowest points. Beginning with SPQMLT-2, a newly developed radio sounder was used to profile ice thickness along the traverse.

=== Measurements Made at Temporary Stations ===
Temporary stations were established at the beginning and end points of the traverse and at intervals of approximately 50–75 km along the route. At each station, the following measurements and investigations were carried out:

- a 40 m vertical borehole was drilled into the ice;
- the density and temperature of the ice were measured at various depths in the borehole;
- the ice sheet was sounded seismically;
- the accumulation rate was studied in hand-excavated pits approximately 2 m deep;
- the intensity and direction of the geomagnetic field were measured;
- snow samples and ice cores were collected and analyzed; and
- the geographic position (latitude and longitude) and a geographic azimuth were determined by celestial (solar) observations using a theodolite.

== Activities and Results of Each Traverse ==
=== SPQMLT-1 ===
SPQMLT-1 began on December 4, 1964, at Amundsen–Scott South Pole Station and, after traveling a zigzag route of 1530 km, ended on January 27, 1965, at the unoccupied Pole of Inaccessibility Station. The surface encountered varied from soft and smooth to hard and rough, with sastrugi over 1-m high. The sky was often clear or patched with light cirrus clouds. Solar halos were observed frequently, and whiteouts occurred several times. The average air temperature was −28 °C, with a maximum of −18°C on January 5 and a minimum of −45 °C on January 26. The greatest wind speed measured was 9 m/s, on December 29 and January 17. On January 8 two skuas were sighted. At Pole of Inaccessibility Station a snow-accumulation stake net was installed and the vehicles were secured. On February 1 personnel and cargo were airlifted to McMurdo Station.

=== SPQMLT-2 ===
SPQMLT-2 began on December 15, 1965, at Pole of Inaccessibility Station (where SPQMLT-1 had ended the previous summer) and, after traveling a dogleg route of 1340 km, ended on January 29, 1966, at the newly constructed Plateau Station . At Pole of Inaccessibility Station a detailed map was drawn, the existing strain-rate and accumulation-stake networks were measured, and a 5-km accumulation stake line was installed. On January 4 a heavily crevassed zone at 82°45′S 15°2′E was encountered when a vehicle broke through a snow bridge and had to be retrieved. The main crevasses were several tens of meters wide, 5 to 7 km long, and oriented approximately east-west. The crevassed zone is above a major anomaly in the bedrock topography, an abrupt rise of over 1200 m over a horizontal distance of less than 9 km. Two similar crevassed zones were spotted by aerial reconnaissance at approximately 82°30′S 8°0′E and 82°0′S 22°0′E. After reaching Plateau Station, a strain network was installed, and all three vehicles were backloaded to McMurdo Station for reconditioning.

=== SPQMLT-3 ===
SPQMLT-3 began on December 5, 1967, at Plateau Station (where SPQMLT-2 had ended nearly two years earlier) and, after traveling a dogleg route of 1326 km, ended on January 29, 1968, at geographic position 78°42.2′S 6°52′W. Aerial reconnaissance of the planned route showed no significant crevassing except near the end point. On December 14, at 320 km from Plateau Station, the traverse encountered a sled-mounted building, similar to the one at Pole of Inaccessibility Station, which was left by a Soviet traverse in March 1967. Cairns built of empty fuel drums were erected at the sites of resupply airdrops. The temperature ranged from −40 °C to −10 °C, and the wind rarely exceeded 18 km/h. Severe whiteouts occurred during the final week of travel. Two pickup flights, on January 30 and 31, airlifted personnel, equipment, snow samples, and one Sno-Cat to McMurdo Station.

== Overall Scientific Results ==
=== Surface Elevation and Slope ===
The elevation (above sea level) of the surface along the routes of SPQMLT-1 and SPQMLT-2, based on the altimeter measurements, averaged 2780 m and 3090 m, respectively. On SPQMLT-1 it ranged from 2628 m at the second turning point (85°10′S 1.6°0′E) to 3718 m at Pole of Inaccessibility Station. On SPQMLT-2 it decreased from there to 2512 m at the turning point (82°00′S 9°35′E), from where it increased eastward (toward Plateau Station) at a gradient of 1 to 3 m/km.

On SPQMLT-3 the elevation ranged from 3625 m at Plateau Station to 2210 m at the ending point (78°42′S 6°52′W). From Plateau Station to the turning point, the surface sloped downward with an average gradient of -0.5 to -1 m/km, and became much more negative on the southwest leg of the traverse. Two pronounced valleys, about 50 m deep and 10 km wide, and several smaller valleys, were encountered near the end of the traverse.

Based on the altimeter and slope measurements, the surface in the region of the traverse slopes downward to the west, toward the Weddell Sea, with a gradient of about -2 m/km.

=== Ice Thickness and Subglacial Topography ===
The elevation of the subglacial terrain, based on the seismic soundings, radio sounding (SPQMLT-2 and SPQMLT-3), and gravity measurements, ranged from nearly 1 km below sea level to more than 1 km above sea level. On SPQMLT-1 and SPQMLT-2 the thickness of the ice averaged 2740 m and 2770 m, respectively.

=== Accumulation Rate ===
The average rate of ice accumulation in the area of the traverse has been estimated at 3.7 g/cm^{2}/yr with a method that involves profiling the radioactivity in the core samples and identifying layers that correspond to a 1955 atmospheric atomic test. This estimate is now considered to be more accurate than earlier estimates based on the pit studies.

=== Geomagnetism ===
The measurements of the intensity and direction of the geomagnetic field were added to the database (now maintained by the National Geophysical Data Center) upon which are based the 1970 and subsequent World Magnetic Charts, World Magnetic Models, and International Geomagnetic Reference Field. The measurements from SPQMLT-3 were compared to the (existing) 1965 World Magnetic Charts (corrected to 1968) and found to disagree on average by more than 1° in magnetic declination and magnetic inclination, and 500 nT in total intensity.

== See also ==
- South Pole Traverse (Goes from South Pole to Hut Point Peninsula (McMurdo))
