= Kawasaki B8M Red-Tank Furore =

- Manufacturer: Kawasaki
- Parent company: Kawasaki Heavy Industries
- Production: 1962-1965
- Successor: Kawasaki F21M
- Class: Motocross
- Engine: 125 cc (7.6 cu in) Air-cooled, rotary disc valve
- Torque: N/A
- Transmission: 4-speed, Chain drive

The B8M was the first racing motorcycle by Kawasaki and it was produced from 1962 - 1965, created based on the Kawasaki B8 which itself is based on the Meihatsu B7. The Red-Tank Furore had a two-stroke 123 cc Kawasaki rotary inlet valve cast iron engine. It was equipped with a four-speed transmission.

The B8M was created solely to compete in the Japanese Motocross Championships by Kawasaki engineers which took a stock Kawasaki B8 and modified it by changing the forks, seat, adding handlebars with a cross bar, raised expansion chamber, knobby tires. A later version was made with "Kawasaki" stretching the length of the fuel tank without knee grips. The success of the B8M lead to the development of the Kawasaki F21M for 1968.

== Racing ==
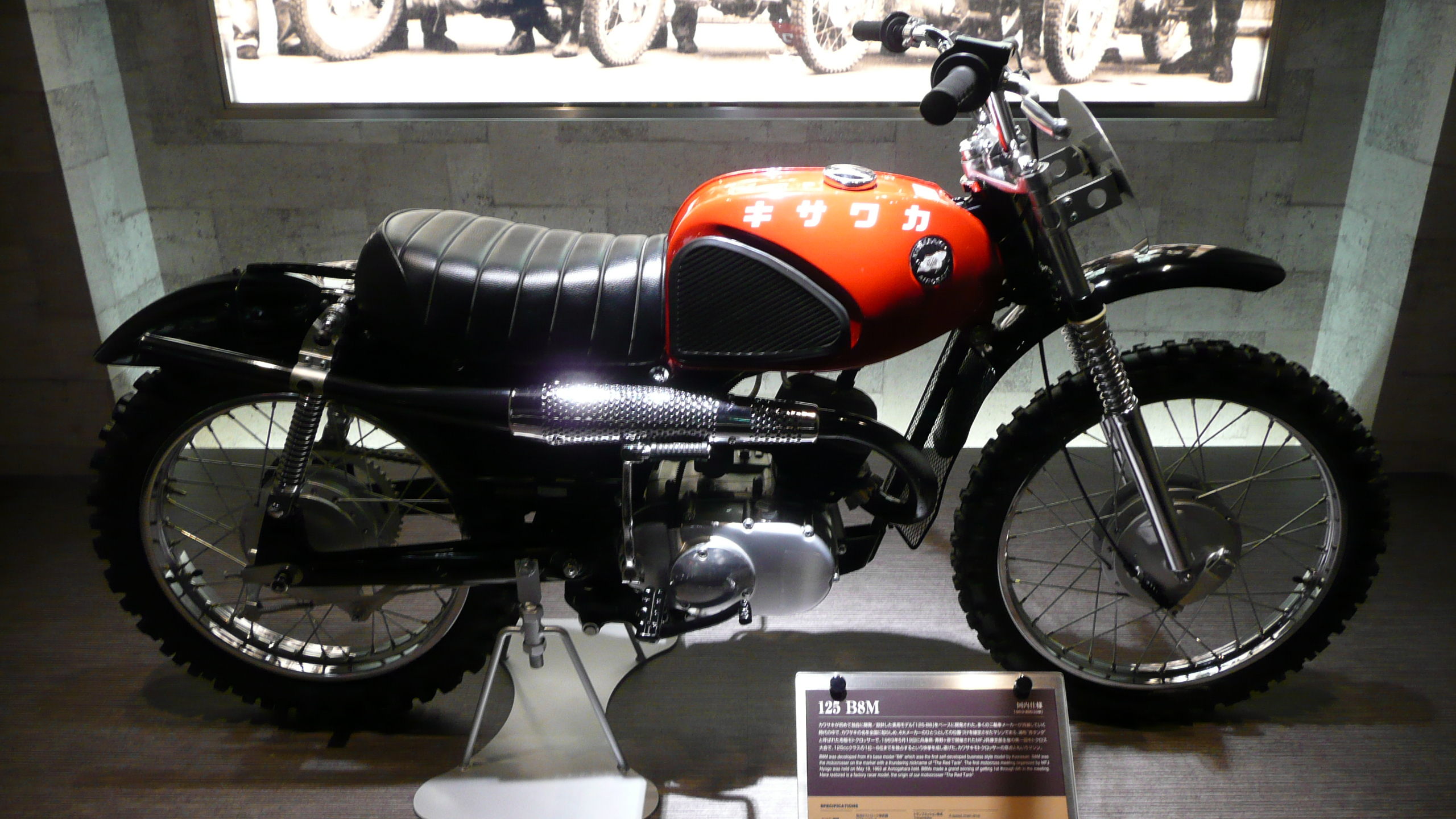

"In 1963, the B8M Motocrosser took the top 6 positions in the Hyogo Prefecture Motocross Tournament. With all the Kawasaki bikes completing the race, the race team proved that the "Kawasakis are strong machines in tough circuits". Later at the Fukui Prefecture Motocross Tournament, the Kawasaki machines won all the race events and at various motocross tournaments held in West Japan, Kawasaki machines were victorious in most of the events - despite not competing the past year. The outstanding achievements of the "Red-Tank Furore", named for its red fuel tank, earned it a fearsome reputation." --Kawasaki Museum
