= Kawasaki B8 =

Former street motorcycle model

- Manufacturer: Kawasaki Aircraft, LTD
- Parent company: Kawasaki Heavy Industries
- Production: 1962-1965
- Class: Standard street
- Engine: 125cc Air-cooled, two-stroke piston inlet port
- Transmission: Chain driven 4-speed
- Suspension: Telescopic forks, spring shocks rear
- Related: Kawasaki B8M Red-Tank Furore

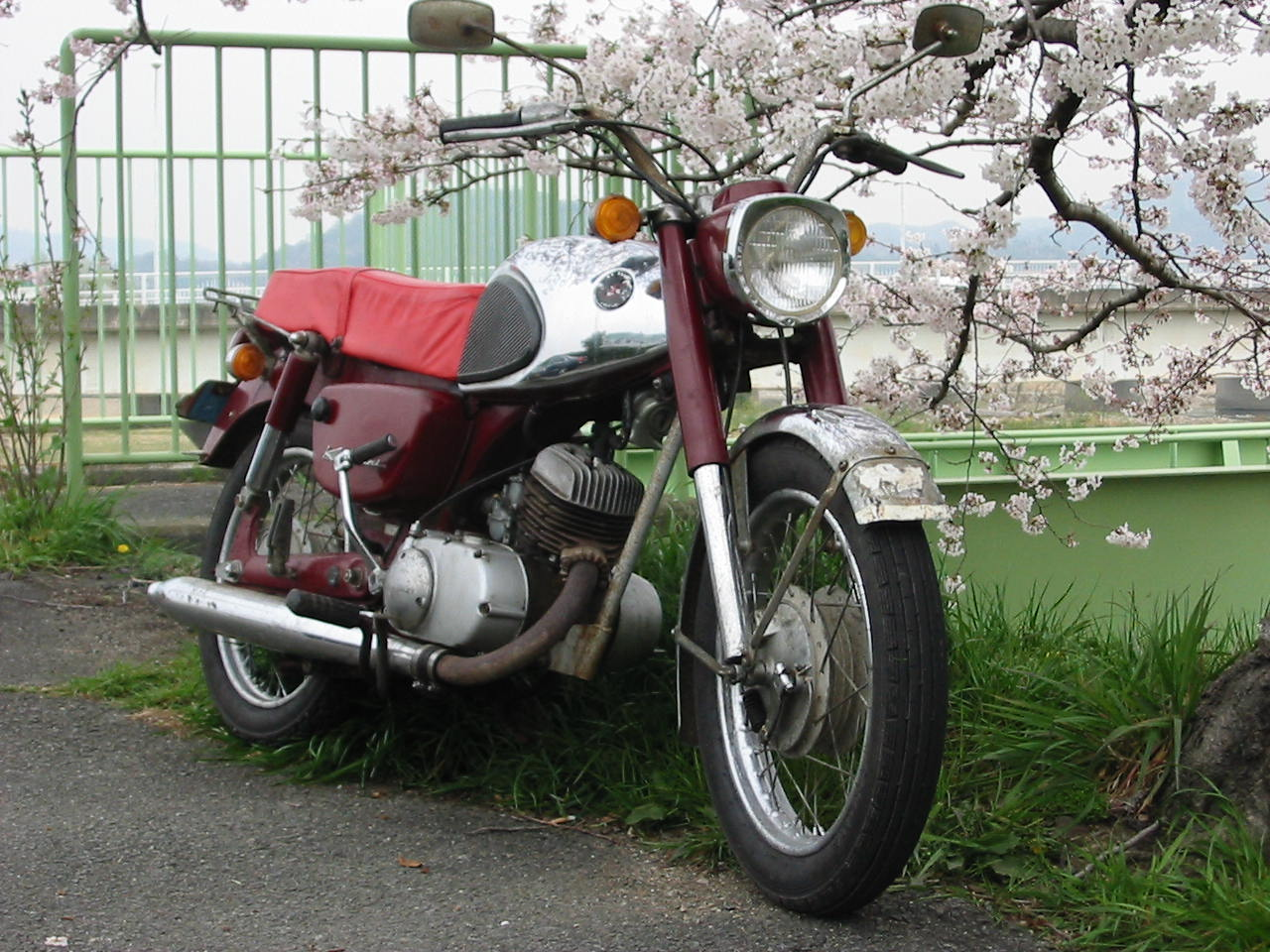

The Kawasaki B8 was a 125cc street motorcycle manufactured by Kawasaki Aircraft, LTD from 1962 through 1965.

== History ==
The B8 was the first motorcycle to be built completely from Kawasaki components. The B8 was based on the Meihatsu B7 which had used Kawasaki engines. The Kawasaki B8 is said to have been popular in Japan because of durability and low cost. The 125cc two stroke, piston inlet valve engine produced 11 horsepower at 8,000 RPM and was designed based on engineering knowledge from Kawasaki Aircraft. The tank emblems read "Kawasaki Aircraft".

== Description ==
The B8 came equipped with a large fuel tank (chrome with bike color), chrome front fender, a seat capable of holding two with a seat strap, a small luggage rack (optional), down-swept exhaust, a painted speedometer built into the headlight, body work hiding the framework in the form of extended and large matching color rear fender, matching color large right and left side compartments with covers, and matching color wide swing arms supporting the shock assembly. Later versions had an enclosed chain guard.

== Racing ==
In 1962, Kawasaki used the B8 platform to create their Kawasaki B8M Red-Tank Furore.
