= Off-road tire =

Category of vehicle tire with deep tread

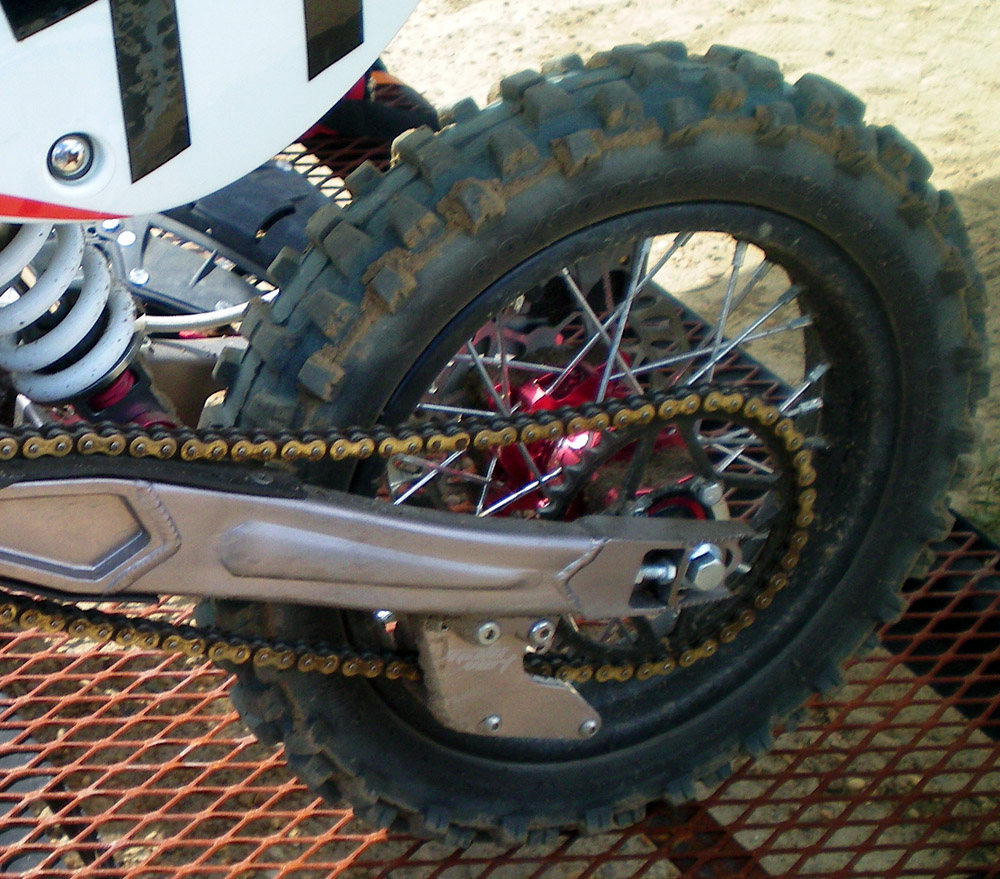
Knobby tire on a 2008 Motovert pit bike

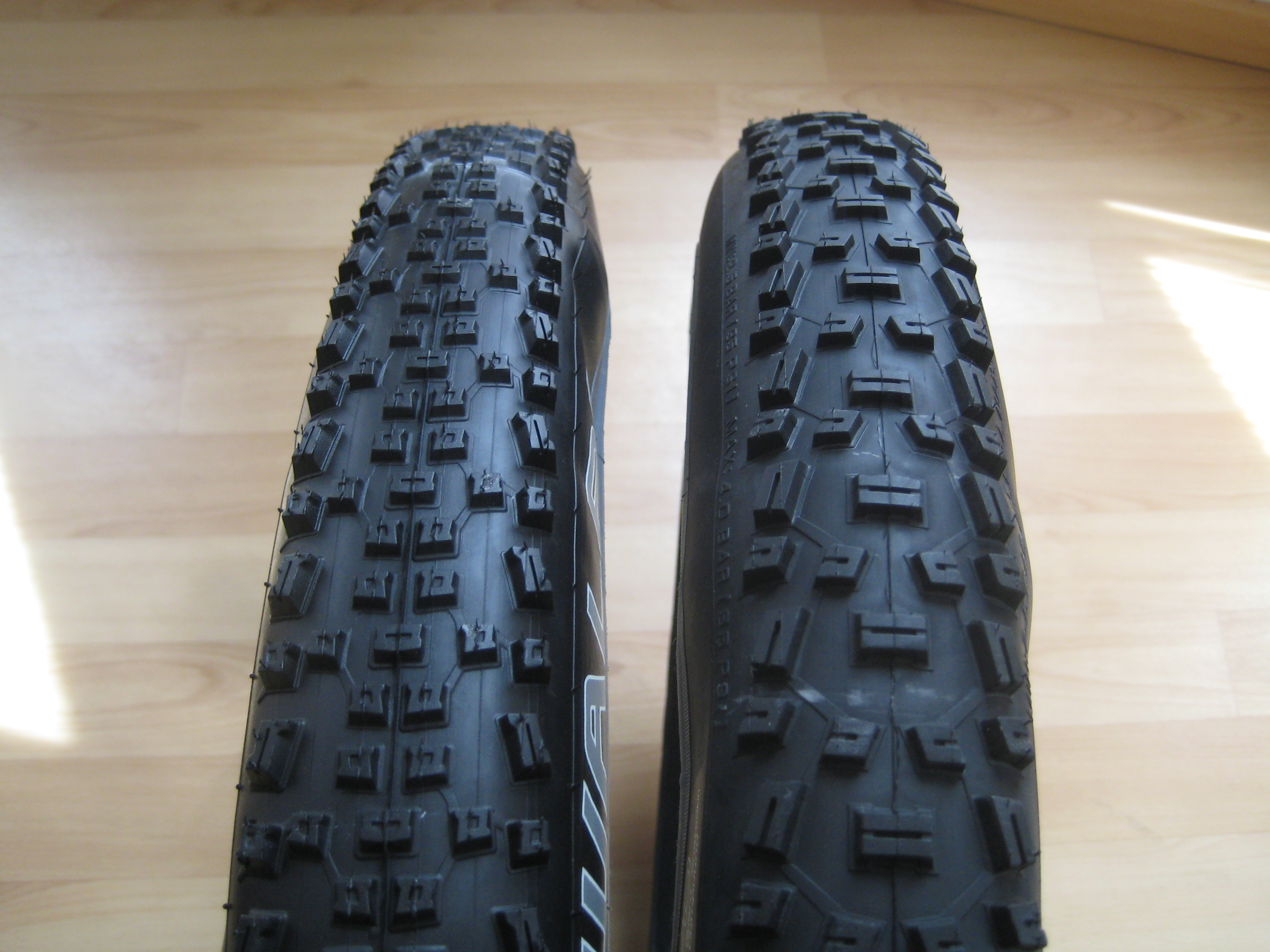
Different treads on knobby mountain bike tires

Off-road tires or Off-road tyres are a category of vehicle tires that use deep tread to provide more traction on unpaved surfaces such as loose dirt, mud, sand, or gravel. Compared to ice or snow tires, they lack studs but contain deeper and wider grooves meant to help the tread sink into mud or gravel surfaces.

== Design ==
Off-road tires are typically radials with thick, deep tread. On dirt surfaces, the exposed edges of the tread dig into soft ground to give more traction than rolling friction alone, analogous to the traction provided by cleated shoes. These off-road tires provide their maximum grip on loose surfaces, but on paved surfaces the smaller contact patch affords less traction as compared to street tires. Tires with less aggressive knobs (smaller knobs and the shape of the tread cross-section closer to that of street tires) can provide a compromise, giving less grip off-road, but a grip closer to that of street tires on paved surfaces. Such tires are useful for enduro and dual-sport motorcycles and other vehicles designed to be used both off-road and on pavement.

Some off-road tires are designed to be used with low inflation pressure on difficult terrain, reducing their rigidity and allowing the tread to better conform to the terrain. Such a design may allow for use on a wider range of surfaces, but tubeless tires running under rated pressure run the risk of breaking their bead. A beadlock can be used to prevent this.

== Use on bicycles, motorcycles, and quads ==
Off-road cycle tires, colloquially called knobbies, may be found on motocross and enduro motorcycles, ATVs, and mountain bikes. Tires for single-track vehicles and ATVs have a curved profile such that some tread only contacts the ground during turning.

Depending on the model of tire, an off-road capable tire may or may not be approved by the DOT. In the United States, such a tire approved for street use will be marked with a DOT code (U.S.), which identifies the tire as street legal. Tires which are not approved for street use will typically be labeled "Motocross Use Only" or "Not for Highway Use". Street legal, knobby tires are generally not suitable for long distances on roads or paved surfaces because of poor NVH properties and excessive wear on the soft rubber.

== All-terrain ==
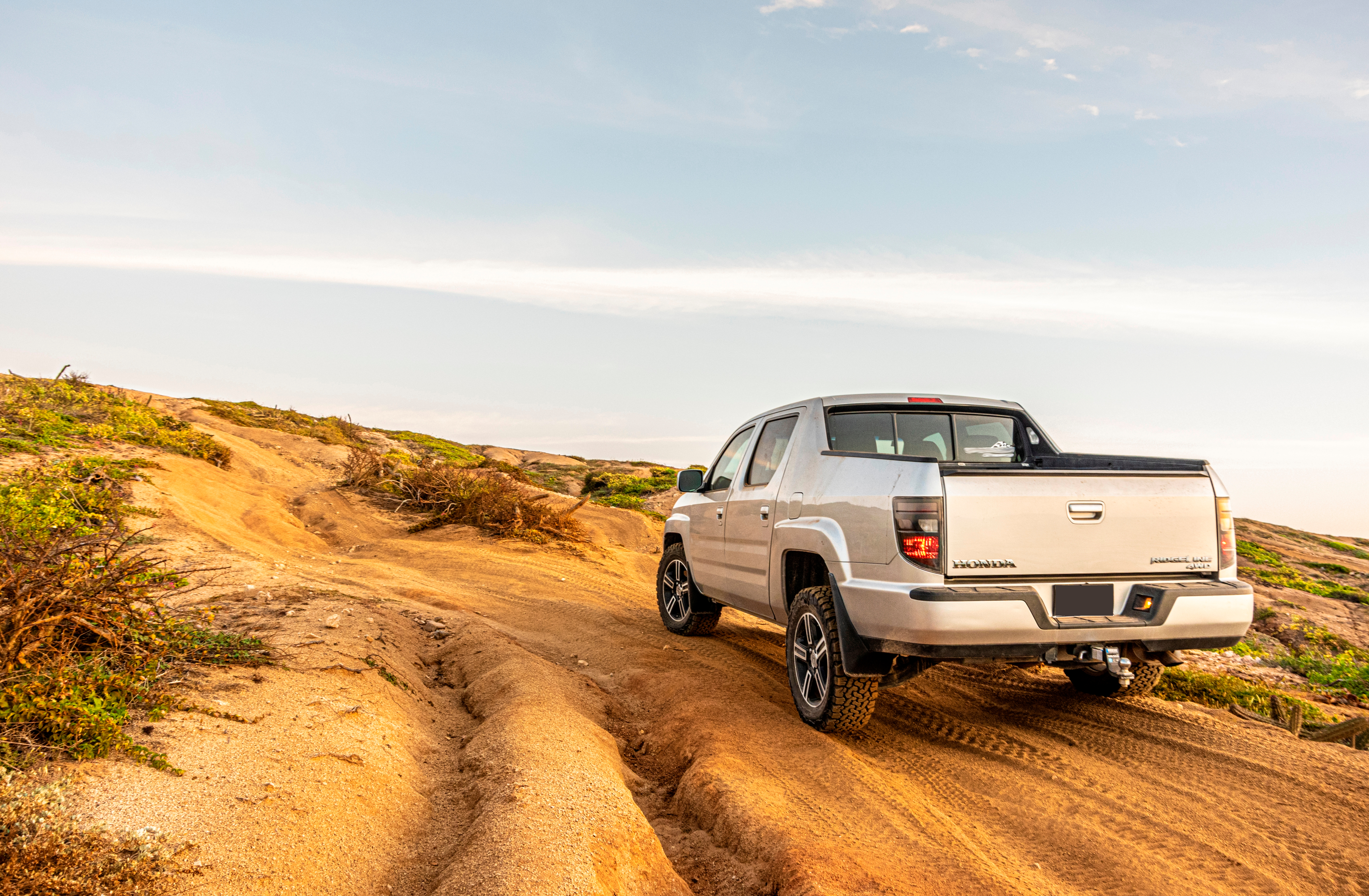
Example of an all-terrain tire

Depending on the design, an off-road tire may be designated "all terrain" ("All-around"), meaning it is intended for use both on- and off-road. Such tires attempt to compromise between grip on loose terrain and safety or comfort on paved roads. Some tires, such as the bar grip used on United States military vehicles in World War II, accomplish this by separating the tire into distinct on-road and off-road tread zones. Modern all-terrain tires typically employ hybrid tread patterns and tougher compound to increase the wear life under mixed-surface conditions.

=== Features of all-terrain tires ===
All-terrain tires are known for their ability to handle different terrains. They come with grooves and channels that distribute the load evenly, improving the traction. This makes all-terrain tires ideal for off-road driving, snow and ice, sand, and other soft surfaces. They are also known for their long lasting performance.

Some of the key features of all-terrain tires (ATTs).

- Largest Tread Depth
- Aggressive Multi-Pitch Pattern
- Cushioning Layer
- Large Void Area
- Tread Design
- Snow & Ice Traction

== Mud and Terrain ==
Tire codes M+T for "Mud and Terrain" and M/T for "Mud Terrain" denote tires designed for mudding, rock crawling or desert racing (especially for bulldust or baja silt). Most mud-terrain tyres are road legal (DOT approved), but maybe prevented from being fitted to modern cars due to laws on minimum tyre speed rating. Most modern cars, SUV and pickup trucks require minimum tyre speed rating of "S" (180kph), but the vast majority of mud-terrain tyres max out at a tyre speed rating of "Q" (160kph). Mud-terrain tyres, may improve traction and have reduced braking distances on dirt roads where the rocks slightly are too big to fit into the grooves and channels of an all-terrain tyre. Traditionally mud-terrain tyres are uncomfortable, loud, dangerous and inefficient (high fuel use and tyre wear) to use on paved roads/asphalt highways. Modern mud-terrain tyres have similar characteristics to high quality aggressive (high void) all-terrain tyres.

== Rugged Terrain Tyre ==
The RT tyres built for drivers who need reliable traction off-road, without sacrificing comfort on the road. It sits between an all-terrain and a mud-terrain, offering a strong mix of durability, grip, and everyday usability.

== See also ==
- Bicycle tire
- Motorcycle tire
- Paddle tire - For use in sand and mud
- Off-road motorcycles
- Off-road vehicles
- Off-roading
- Bar grip
- Cyclo-cross bicycle
- Mountain bike
- Rolligon
- All-rounder (cycling)
