= Retread =

Re-manufacturing process for tires that replace the tread on worn tires

Bluefield Retread Company in Bluefield, West Virginia

Retread (also known as recap or remold) is a re-manufacturing process for tires that replace the tread on worn tires. Retreading is applied to casings of spent tires that have been inspected and repaired. It preserves about 90% of the material in spent tires and the material cost is about 20% compared to manufacturing a new one.

== Applications ==
=== United States ===
Some applications for retreaded tires are airplanes, racing cars, buses and delivery trucks. Use of retreaded tires was common historically, but as of 2008, it was seldom used for passenger vehicles, mainly due to discomfort on the road, safety issues and cheaper tire brands surfacing on the market. About 17.6 million retreaded tires were sold in North America in 2006.

== Process ==
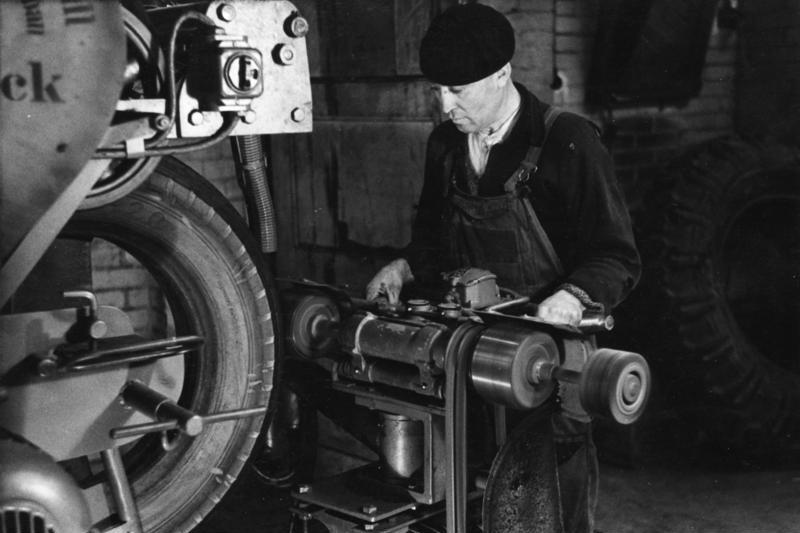
An archival photo from Germany of the retreading process

There are two main processes used for retreading tires, called Mold Cure and Pre Cure. Both processes start with the inspection of the tire, followed by non-destructive inspection method such as shearography to locate non-visible damage and embedded debris and nails. Some casings are repaired and some are discarded. Tires can be retreaded multiple times if the casing is in usable condition. Tires used for short delivery vehicles are retreaded more than long haul tires over the life of the tire body. Casings fit for retreading have the old tread buffed away to prepare for retreading.

A Portuguese language news video showing the retreading process on tires. Retreading allows tires to remain out of landfills, and reuse a large percentage of the material.

Material cost for a retreaded tire is about 20% that of making a new tire. About 90% of the original tires by weight is retained in retreaded tires. A 1997 study estimates that then current generation of commercial vehicles tires to last up to 600,000 miles (970,000 km) if they're retreaded two to three times.

=== Pre cure ===
Previously prepared tread strip is applied to tire casing with cement. This method allows more flexibility in tire sizes and it is the most commonly used method, but results in a seam where the ends of the strip meet.

=== Mold cure ===
Following a thorough quality inspection, the worn tire tread is removed from the casing by buffing. Raw rubber is then applied to the tire casing and it is then placed in a mold where tread is formed. A dedicated mold is required for each tire size and tread design. This tread application method is very similar to that of the new tire manufacturing process.

==== Bead to Bead molding ====
In this subtype, retreading is also applied to the side walls. These tires are given entirely new branding and stamps.

== Regulations ==
Some jurisdictions have regulations concerning tire retreading.

=== Europe ===
In Europe all retreads, by law, must be manufactured according to EC Regulation 108 (car tires) or 109 (commercial vehicle tires). As part of this regulation all tires must be tested according to the same load and speed criteria as those undergone by new tires.

The Land Fill Directive of 1999 banned tires in landfills in 2003, and banned shredded tires in 2006.

=== United States ===
The Department of Transportation requires marking of a "DOTR number" which shows the name of the retreader and when it was retreaded.

== Safety ==
The United States National Highway Traffic Safety Administration recognizes the public perception that retread tires frequently used by heavy vehicles are less safe than new tires as evidenced by tire debris frequently found on highways. The NHTSA is continuing research to determine the proportion of tire debris from retreads in comparison to new tires. Additionally, the NHTSA is researching the cause of tire failure and the crash safety problem posed by tire failures.

Federal Executive Order 13149, signed by President Bill Clinton supports the use of retread tires for economic and environmental efficiency by requiring federal vehicles to use retread tires after original factory equipped tires become non serviceable, but only when "such products are reasonably available and meet applicable performance standards".

== Environmental impact ==
Retread tires in service lower the volume of raw materials required for the manufacturing of a new tire. This includes a pronounced reduction in the use of oil. In fact, the US EPA estimated a greater than 75% savings in oil used for a retread as compared to a new tire. This also means significant reductions in greenhouse gas emissions. A car tire has 40% natural rubber and 60% oil based rubber, a retreading of tires will reduce the need for natural rubber significantly.

In addition to reducing the amount of raw materials extracted, retread tires also minimize the amount of waste that ends up in landfills. The latest figures by the US EPA indicate that over 11.2 M waste tires were dumped into the U.S. municipal solid waste stream. To understand this figure, it is equivalent to lining up passenger tires tread to tread from roughly Los Angeles to San Diego or Philadelphia to Washington DC. Because a retread tire prevents the need for manufacturing a new tire, significant environmental benefits are achieved.

== See also ==
- Tire recycling
