= Grouser =

Device to increase vehicle traction

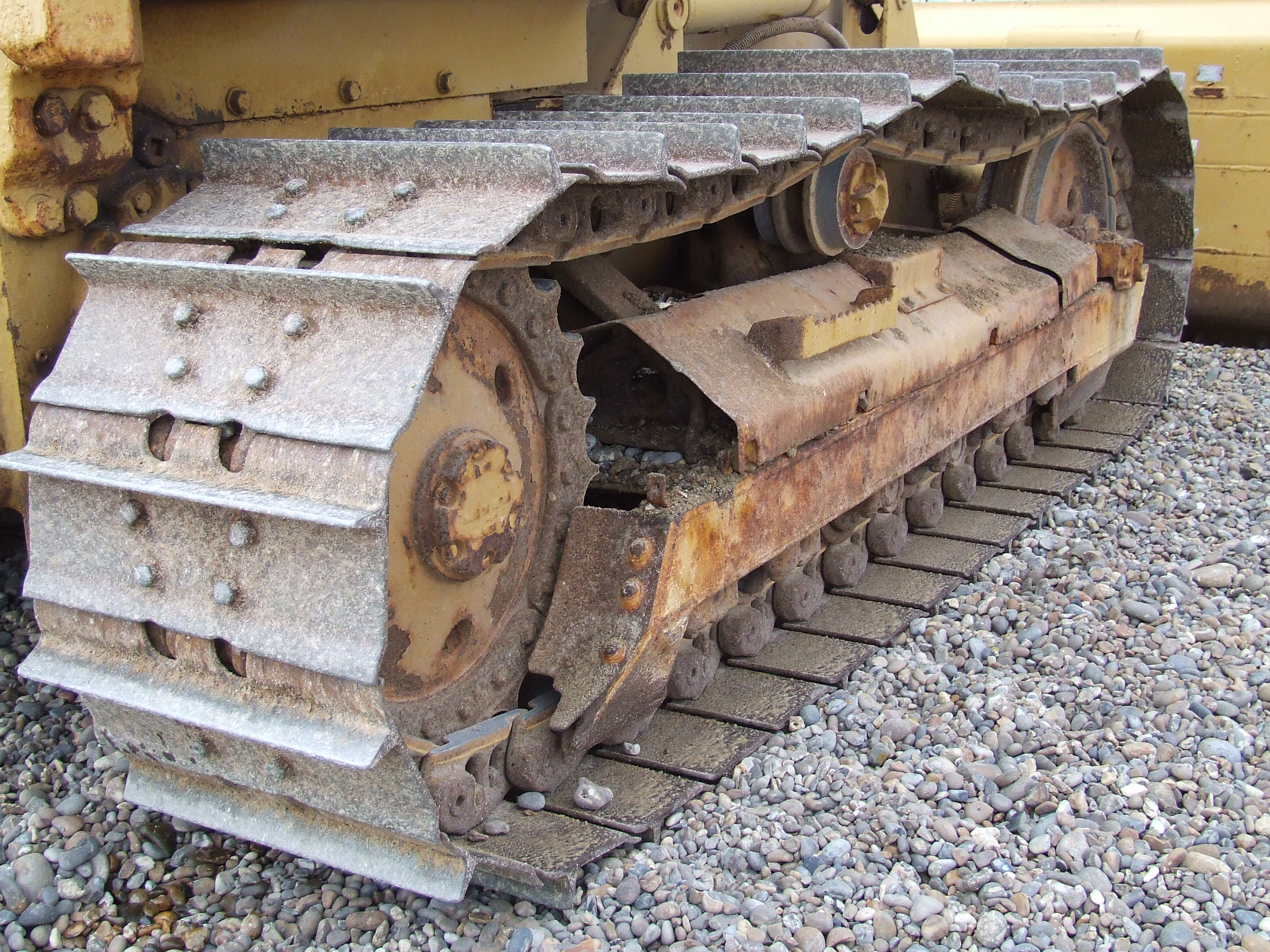
Grousers on a bulldozer track

Grousers are devices intended to increase the traction of continuous tracks, especially in loose material such as soil or snow. This is done by increasing contact with the ground with protrusions, similar to conventional tire treads, and analogous to athletes' cleated shoes. On tanks and armoured vehicles, grousers are usually pads attached to the tracks; but on construction vehicles they may take the form of flat plates or bars.

Similar traction-improving patterns have been implemented on the surface of the wheels on tractors. These include strakes, where material is removed from the surface of the wheel to achieve protrusion; cleats, with spikes instead of straight bars; and lugs with raised rubber on a tire tread.

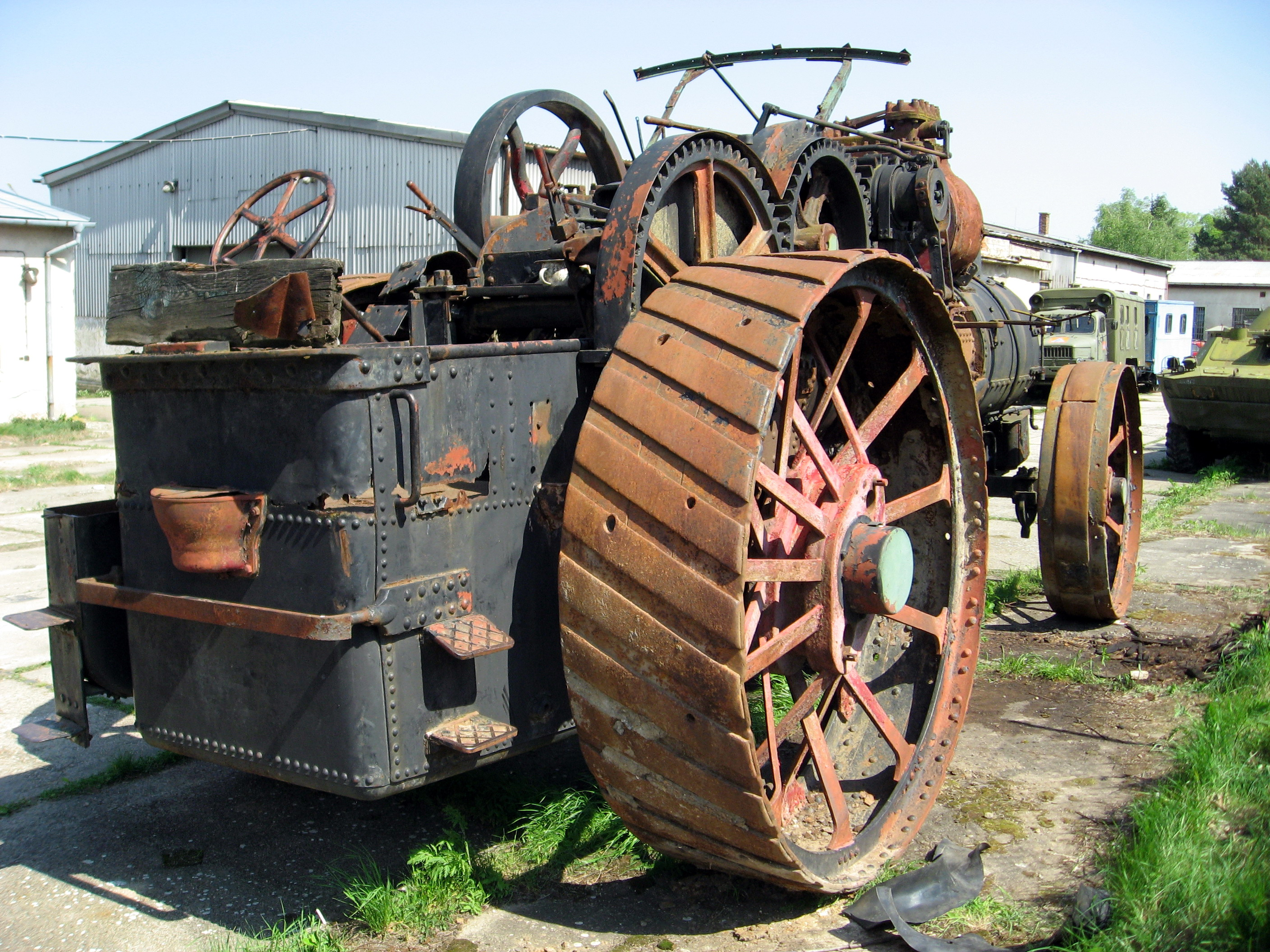
Steam traction engine, with straked wheels, constructed of riveted steel

== Variations ==
Developed during World War I, external track extensions – often called "grousers" or "duckbills" – were added to the outside edges of the trackshoes on armored fighting vehicles such as tanks, widening the track for improved performance in snow or mud. Track segments (i.e., trackshoes) that incorporate grouser bars are known as grouser shoes, and typically include one to three grousers.

To facilitate towing on soft ground and lessen recoil the wheels WWI artillery pieces were often fitted with Bonagente grousers patented by the Italian major Crispino Bonagente. These consisted of twelve rectangular plates connected with elastic links and are visible in many photographs of World War I artillery from all of the combatants. The combination of Bonagente grousers and ramps were usually enough to handle recoil for field use. For towing the tail of the gun hooked onto a limber for towing by a horse team or artillery tractor.

Grousers are commonly used on construction vehicles such as bulldozers, loaders, and excavators. Grousers may be permanently attached to, or formed as a single piece with, the track shoe, or they may be bolted onto the track shoe for ease of replacement as they become worn. While grousers are usually straight, they may have more complex shapes, including spikes and involute curves, depending on the type of terrain and the performance requirements of the vehicle. Grousers are typically made of metal, such as forged steel, and are not designed for use on paved roads. Various devices, with names such as road bands, have been developed to temporarily cover grousers/cleats in order to allow a vehicle to travel on paved roads.

Grousers have been used in such exotic environments as the deep sea floor, and the surfaces of the Moon and Mars. Snowmobiles once used cleated tracks, but racing snowmobiles are banned from using cleated track for safety reasons and instead use rubber tracks.

Protrusions molded into rubber tractor tire treads are known as lugs, as are cleats for round wheels, which perform a similar function. Unlike metal grousers, these rubber tire treads or crawler-track shoes/pads may be more suitable for driving on roads.

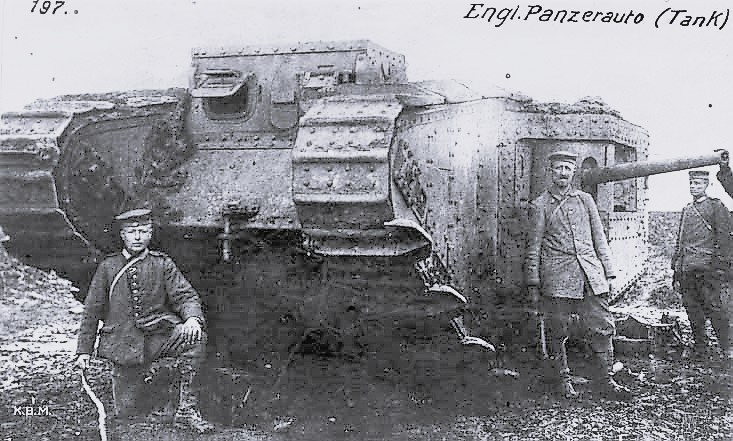
Grousers on a captured World War I British tank.

== Terramechanics ==
Grousers function by trapping soil against the contact area of the track. It is the shearing of the soil against itself that generates tractive force. The gross tractive effort, or soil thrust, of a vehicle may be calculated from the equation:

$$H = blc \left ( 1 + \frac{2h}{b} \right ) + W \tan \phi \left ( 1 + 0.64 \left [ \left ( \frac{h}{b} \right ) \cot^{-1} \left ( \frac{h}{b} \right ) \right ] \right )$$

where:

$H =$ soil thrust
$b =$ track width
$l =$ contact length
$c =$ coefficient of cohesion (a soil property)
$h =$ grouser height
$W =$ gross vehicle weight
$\phi =$ angle of repose (a soil property)

== Gallery ==
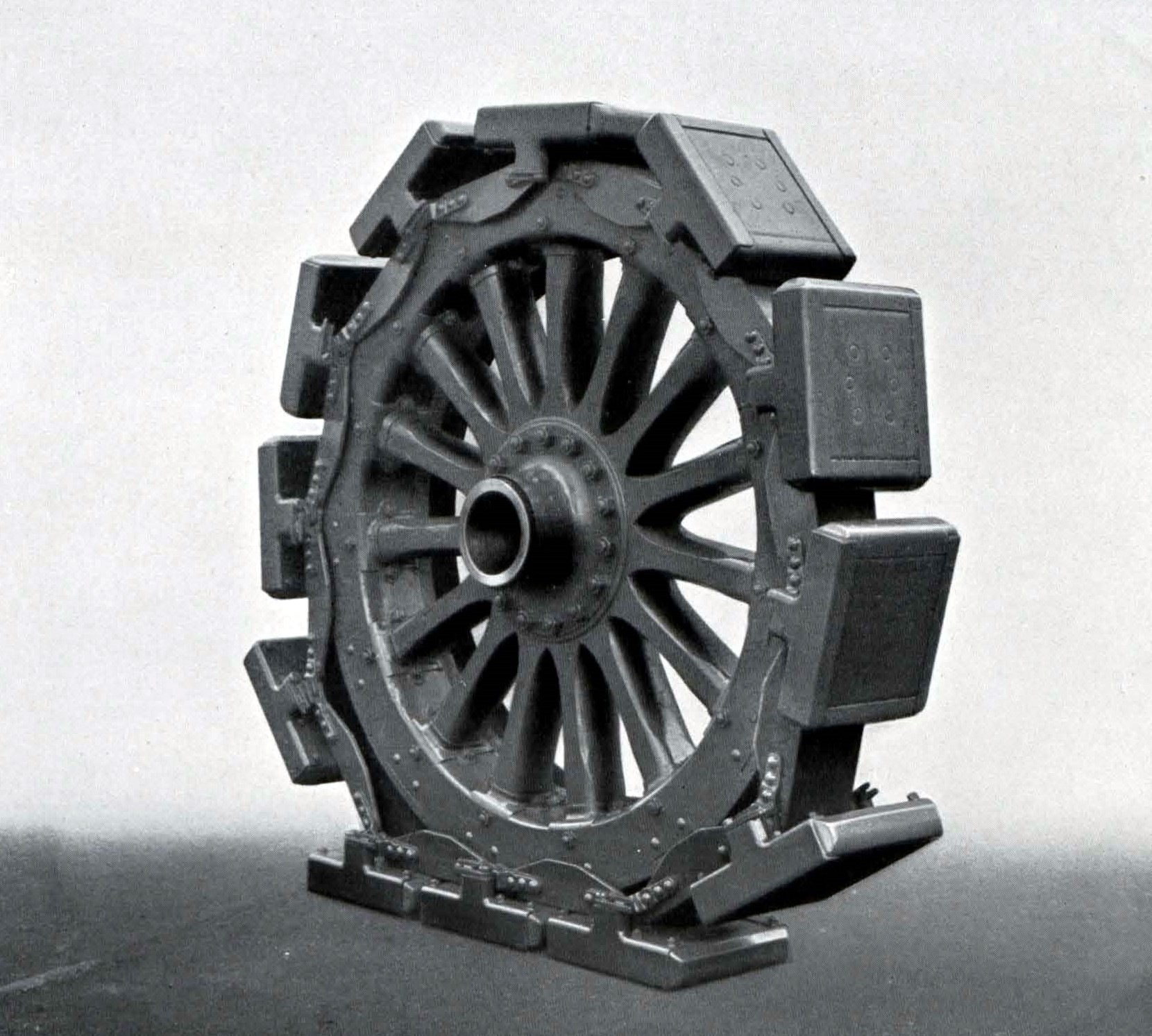
A Bonagente grouser used on WWI heavy artillery.

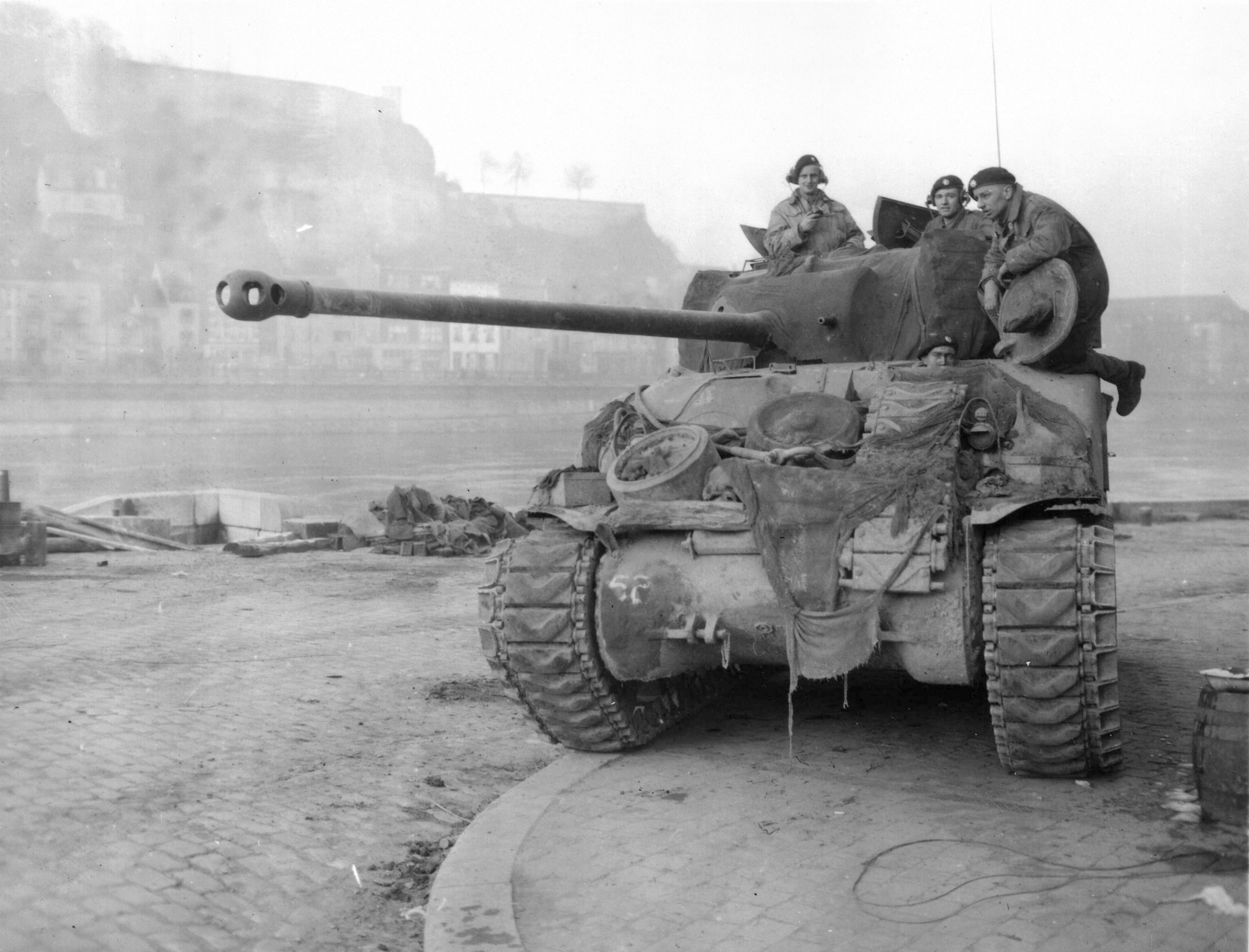
A British Sherman Firefly tank fitted with track grousers

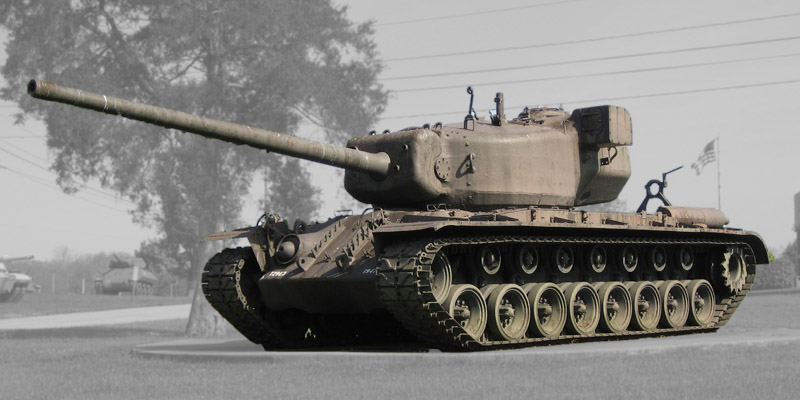
An experimental American T29 heavy tank of 1945 with grousers to widen the track

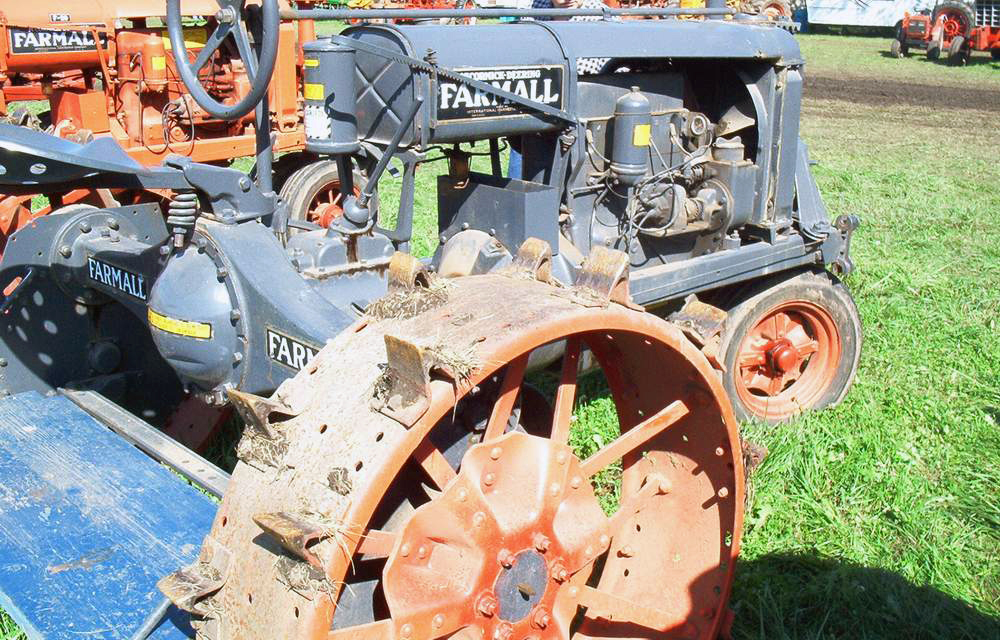
Cleats on the drive wheel of a Farmall tractor

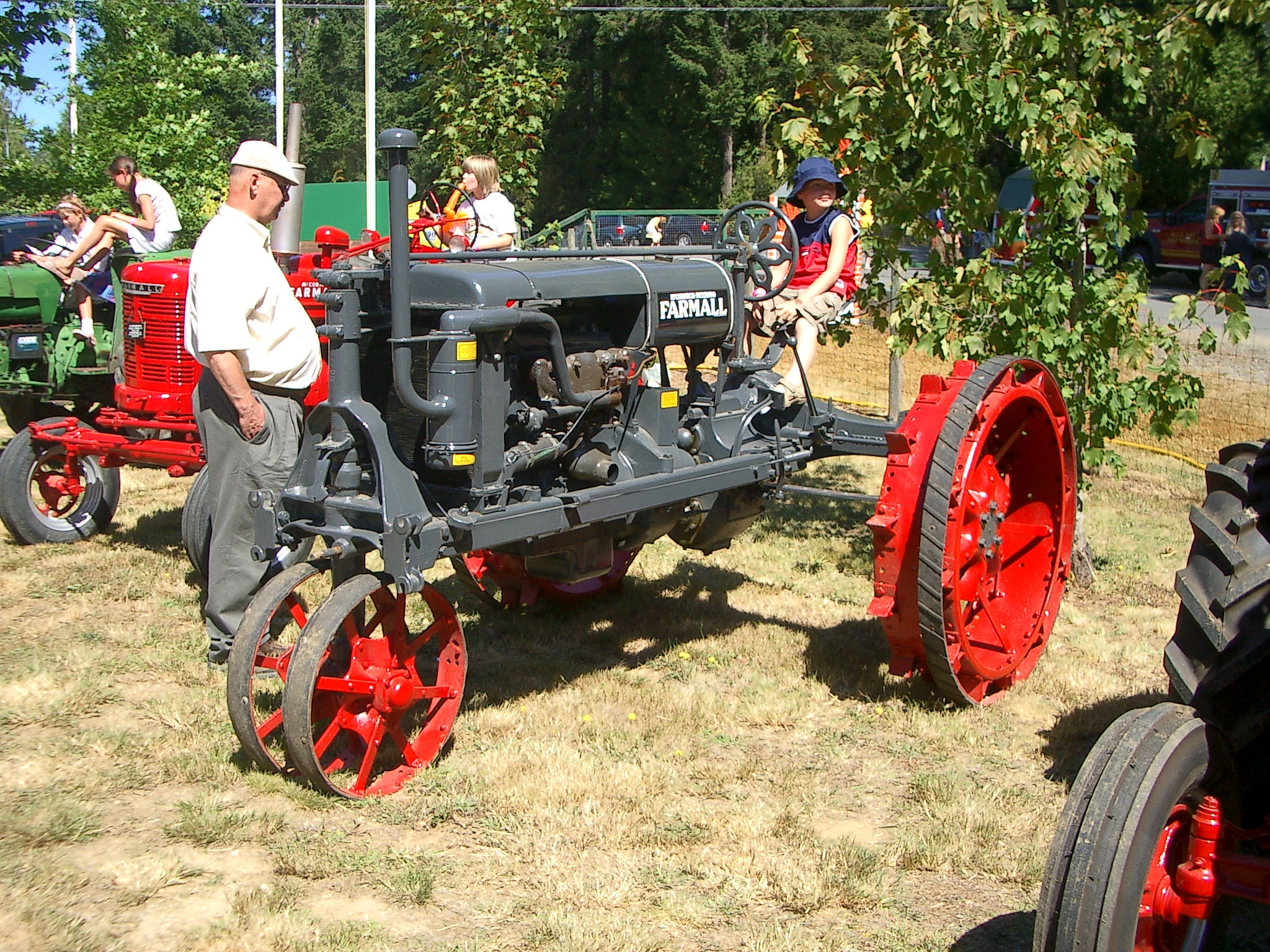
A Farmall tractor with road bands fitted to facilitate driving on paved roads

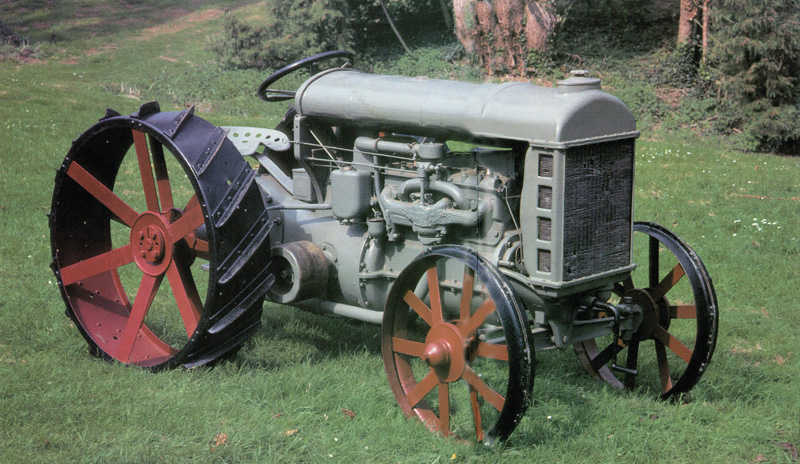
A Fordson tractor displaying another style of cleats, made of angle stock

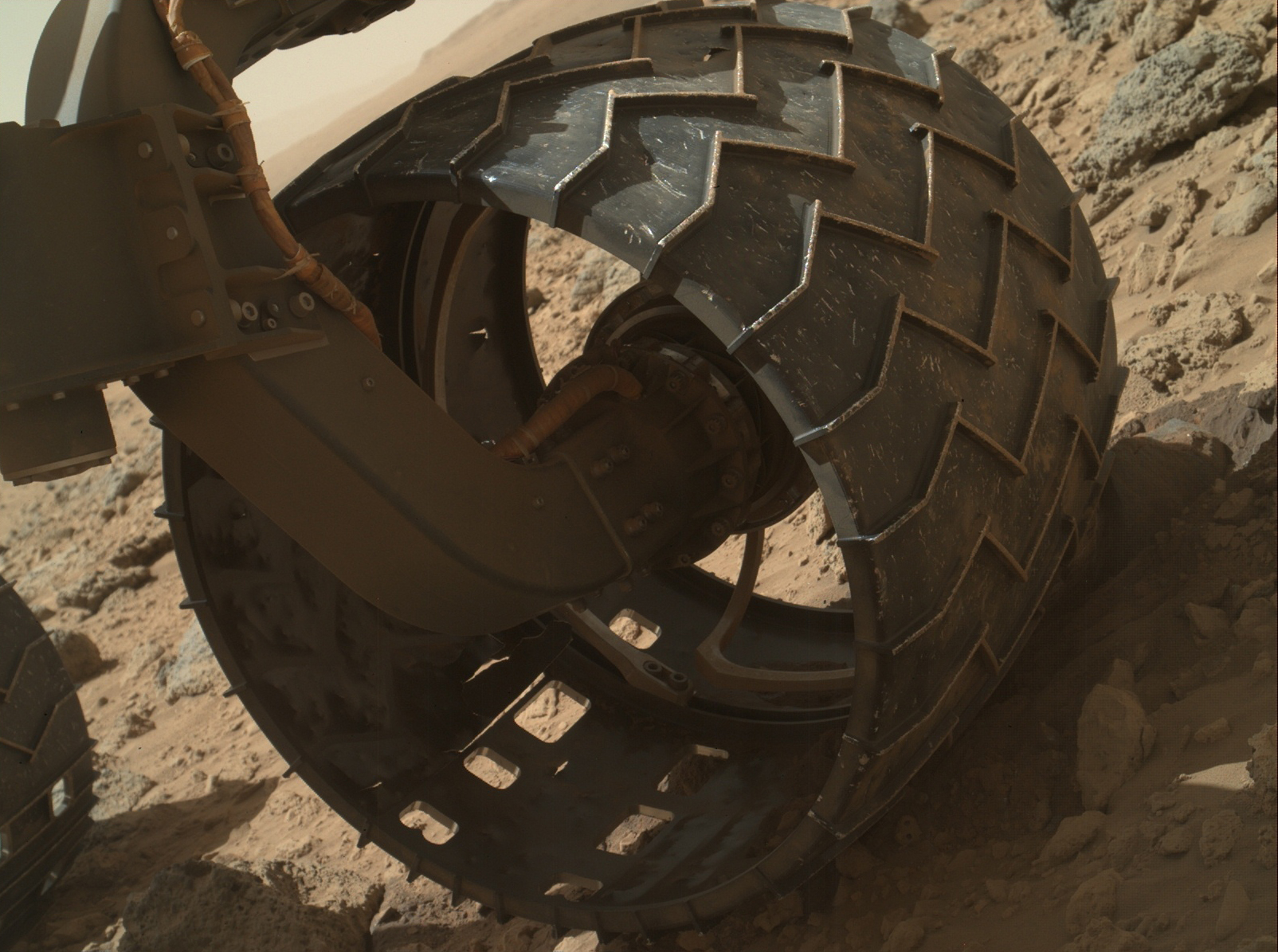
Grousers on the wheel of the mars rover Curiosity

== See also ==
- Dreadnought wheel
- Bar grip tyre
- Heavy equipment (construction)
- Soil mechanics
- Terramechanics
