= Paddle tire =

Type of offroad tire

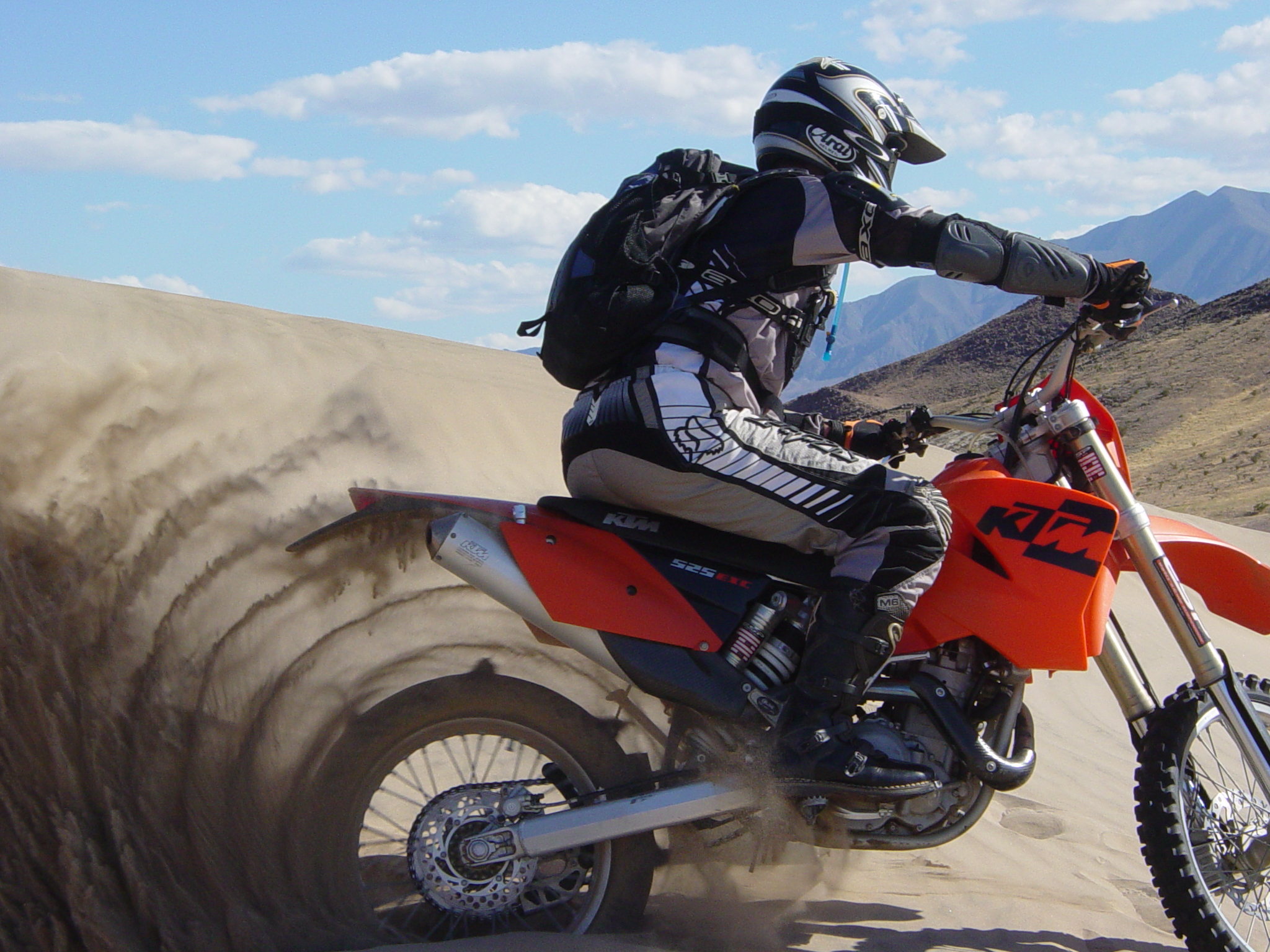
Paddle tire in use.

Paddle tires (tyres in Commonwealth English) are mainly used on off road vehicles, specifically designed for use in sand and mud. They consist of a smooth tire core which has a series of large rubber cups (or paddles) attached to it. The volume inside of a paddle is much larger than the void of a knobby tire, so it is unlikely to clog up with sand/mud. A street legal mud tire is a more or less normal tire, but with extra large gaps or "voids" between each tread block (called "lugs") to allow centrifugal force to "self-clean" or fling the mud out of the gap. Smaller gaps trap the mud in between the tire lugs, which turns the tire into something resembling a "slick" with no tread at all, which will have no traction in mud.

A paddle tire is an even more extreme version of this, optimized for mud or sand. The paddle provides superior traction in the sand, in part because the paddles dig into the sand and push off from the buried sand, not just the surface, and in mud, the gigantic "voids" give no place for mud to stick. They work something like a paddle wheel on a paddle-steamer. Street legal mud tires are a compromise between large voids and a smooth rolling shape for on-road use. The more "extreme" a mud tire (such as a "Super Swamper") is, the harsher and louder it is on a hard surface.

A "tractor tire" on a farm tractor is a somewhat milder version of a paddle tire, only the voids are smaller to allow for limited use on hard surfaces, and the "lugs" are angled to give lateral traction. A paddle tire is so optimized for mud that the shape is of no use on anything other than a soft surface, since the vibration and lack of control of the tire would otherwise render a vehicle almost unusable.

One other way the paddle tire is a specialized application only is that it gives only forward/rearward traction. This means that it is used on a wheel that drives a vehicle to push it forward, but gives little "lateral" (side-to-side) traction. For that reason, the tires of the vehicle that steer it are generally more "normal" tires, since a paddle tire on a steering wheel will just slide sideways rather than pulling the vehicle with it. So, many 4WD vehicles will use paddle tires only on the rear, even though the front wheels are powered as well. On a 2WD or a motorbike, the rear wheel is the only drive wheel, and so putting a paddle tire on the front wheels is useless or worse, since steering performance will be negatively impacted.

Paddle tires are available for motocross bikes, all-terrain vehicles, sandrails, and 4 wheel drives. Because the paddles are rigid and stick up several inches, they are not suitable for use on roads or hard terrain, and are not road legal in most places.

Often on rear wheel drive quads and dirt bikes specific front sand tires are used in conjunction with rear paddle tires. These front tires are usually called "razorbacks" or simply "ribbed" front tires. The tire carcass overall is smooth with the exception of one to three longitudinal ribs around the circumference of the tire. These ribs are usually about an inch high. This design promotes flotation in the sand due to the smooth part of the tire but also, using the rib to dig into the sand, it provides extra turning force.

== See also ==
- Bar grip tire
