= Cyclo-cross bicycle =

Bicycle designed for cyclo-cross racing

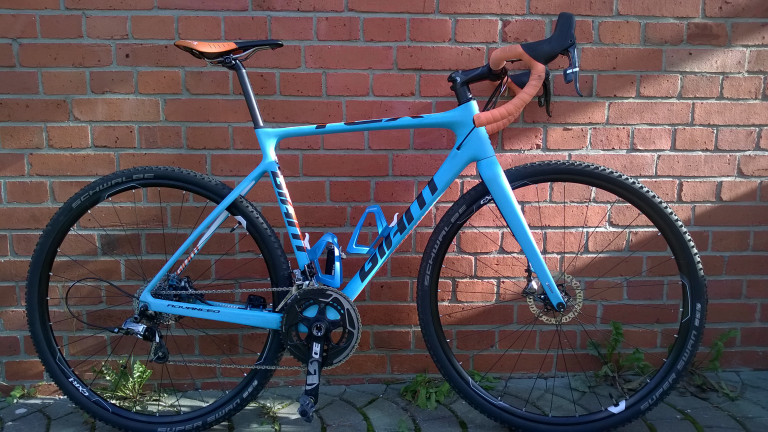
Giant TCX cyclo-cross bicycle

A cyclo-cross bike or cyclo-cross bicycle (abbreviated CX bike or CXB) is a bicycle specifically designed for the rigors of a cyclo-cross race. Cyclo-cross bicycles roughly resemble the racing bicycles used in road racing. The major differences between the two are the frame geometry, and the wider clearances that cyclo-cross bikes have for their larger tires and mud and other debris that they accumulate.

Cyclists have been competing in races on road-going bicycles since the 19th century. Cyclo-cross emerged as a sport in its own right in France in 1902. Cyclo-cross bicycles are similar to other bicycles, but the frame geometry is closer to a mountain bike than a road racing bicycle. The top tube is often longer and closer to horizontal, and the handlebars are higher, again akin to mountain bikes. The emphasis on bicycle handling skills differentiates cyclo-cross from road racing. Cyclo-cross courses are held on a variety of terrain, including grass, mud, sand and paved surfaces.

== History ==
There are many stories about the origins of cyclo-cross - and so about the origin of cyclo-cross bikes. What can be assumed to be certain is that the cyclo-cross bikes are a further development of normal racing bikes, which have been adapted to the needs of cyclo-cross sport. Today, they are often described as having a mixture of mountain bike and road bike characteristics, but in fact existed decades before mountain bikes were introduced in the bicycle world.

The first explicit cyclo-cross bicycles appeared in the 1960s, manufactured by European companies from the Netherlands, Belgium and Italy. At first the frames were usually made of steel; nowadays, aluminum and carbon fibre are more common, at least in regard to cyclo-cross bikes built for racing.

== Characteristics ==
=== Frame design ===
Frame materials are selected with an aim to produce a lightweight, yet stiff and responsive frame. Low weight is prized for ease of carrying while running. Cyclo-cross racers may lift or carry their bikes as many as 30 times in one 60 minute race, increasing the desire for a lightweight bicycle. Aluminum frames were popular in cyclo-cross bicycles long before they became commonplace on the road. Today the most popular material is aluminium with carbon fiber being popular at a professional level.

Cyclo-cross frames require clearance for slightly wider (generally 30–34 mm) tires and the debris and mud that is picked up by them. They are typically very simple, often eschewing bridges between the rear stays. Compact geometry frames with sloping top tubes are less common than on road bicycles due to the need to carry the bicycle easily on the shoulder. Top tube (rather than bottom bracket) routed derailleur cables help combat the build-up of mud. Some specialist cyclo-cross bikes also have a higher bottom bracket to aid clearance over rough ground; extra clearance could prevent toe clips from dragging while re-mounting after an obstacle. This is less common as clipless pedals have become the norm for cyclo-cross.

Typically, the frame geometry is somewhat more relaxed than that of a road bike, not as upright in the seat tube, which allows for more stability in soft ground. Also, the wheelbase can be a bit longer, which provides a more planted feeling when using aft body weighting over rough terrain, and can help keep the rider's feet from contacting the front wheel during a tight turn.

=== Components ===
Choices of equipment tend more towards the idiosyncratic than in road racing; for example single-speed bicycles also have some popularity due to the advantage of mechanical simplicity in the often very muddy conditions and the fringe nature of the sport. Gearing is typically lower, with most common setups using a 46-36 (110mm BCD) or 48-38 (130mm BCD) chainring combination with a 12–25 to 12-30 cassette. Some riders opt to use a single chainring in the front (typically a 40-42 tooth chainring) while retaining multiple sprockets in the rear cassette. This has some of the advantages of the single-speed: the weight of the front derailleur and the front shift lever are lost, a single chainring allows for a tighter chainline, thus reducing the chance of throwing a chain on a bumpy course, and further, racing is psychologically simpler.

Wheels are of the normal road racing type fitted with knobby tires (a variety of tread designs in both tubular and clincher types are available), although deeper rim profiles may be preferred for their advantages in thick mud. There are slight geometry differences between road and cyclocross bicycles; cyclo-cross bikes tend to have slightly higher handlebars for a more upright position as aerodynamics have little importance in a cross race. A second set of brake levers on the tops, called "top mount" or "interrupter" brake levers, are favored by some competitors. These are also commonly called "cross levers" due to their popularity in the sport. The top tubes of cyclocross bike frames typically have an ovalized or flattened bottom profile to provide greater comfort when riders need to shoulder and carry their bikes. In general, with a change of tires and gearing a cyclo-cross bike can double as a perfectly adequate road racing machine. However, most cyclo-cross racers prefer clipless mountain bike pedals for their easy dual-sided entry and mud-shedding abilities. Additionally, mountain biking shoes provide better traction while running than typical road style shoes thanks to flexibility in the sole and pronounced tread patterns, and may even be fitted with two screw-threaded studs of the same type traditionally used on soccer boots.

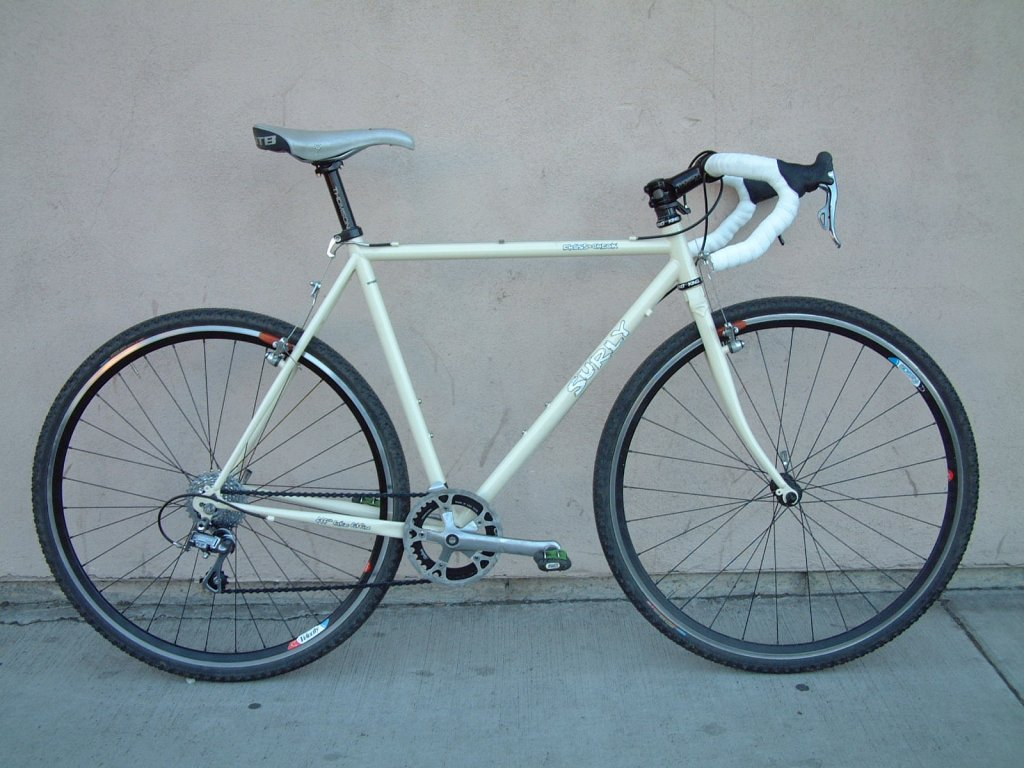
Surly Crosscheck cyclo-cross bicycle with Campagnolo groupset and a single chainring

Cyclocross cantilever brake bosses are more often equipped with traditional center-pull cantilever brakes than the more contemporary and powerful linear-pull brakes ("V-brakes") due to two reasons: native compatibility (insufficient brake cable pull) with the majority of drop-bar brake levers; and the cantilever brake's greater brake pad-to-rim clearance, which minimizes drag in muddy conditions. "Mini-V's" are gaining in popularity as they have both the native cable pull, and some of the increased power of traditional linear-pull brakes over cantilever brakes.

Since the lifting of the UCI ban on disc brake use in cyclocross racing, bike component and frame manufacturers have immediately started developing and testing race-level cyclocross bikes equipped with disc brakes. While disc brakes are heavier than cantilever brakes, the trade off is that they allow for later and significantly more powerful braking in racing conditions.

=== Tires ===
Tire choice is very important in cyclo-cross racing. Off-road tubular tires are still very popular; even more so than in road racing. This is, in part, due to their ability to be used at low pressure around 1.5-2.75 bar (22-40 psi) without increasing the risk of pinch flats. Low pressure is desirable because it increases contact patch area which can increase traction on soft surfaces. This increases the risk of the rim bottoming out on the ground, however, and this is a problem with clincher tires because the tube can be pinched by the rim, causing a flat. With tubular tires, this is not a problem, as they cannot pinch flat. The only concern is damage to the rim. Tubular tires also offer a weight saving and the ability to be ridden on even when flat so that a racer can reach the pits for a replacement.

Clinchers do have their advantages. Changing tires is much quicker since it does not involve a lengthy glueing and curing process so a rider can have a large selection of tires at their disposal. Until recently, clinchers also generally had more cutting edge tread patterns than the more traditional tubulars. Some enthusiasts even went as far as to send Michelin Mud tires (a popular clincher tire) to Dugast (a manufacturer of high end tubular tires) to have a modern tread pattern incorporated into a traditional tubular. However, since 2005 several tubular manufacturers have designed more modern style tread patterns, namely Dugast with its Rhino, Tufo with its Flexus and Challenge with its Grifo and Fango. Lastly, clincher tires generally cost less than tubulars.

Because cyclo-cross season spans autumn/fall and winter, course conditions can vary quite drastically. Often racers have at least dry and wet weather tires to choose between. Dry tires tend to have much smaller, closely spaced tread such as the diamond pattern for low rolling resistance. Wet weather tires have larger and more widely spaced knobs to aid in grip and mud shedding. Tires do not usually vary in width a great deal due to the theory that a narrow tire has the least rolling resistance (for dry courses) and that it will also cut through mud to the harder ground underneath (for wet/muddy courses). Although widths below 30c (denoting the tire width in millimeters) were popular in the past, current tires tend to be available from 30-35c with 32 and 34 being the most common.

== Equipment choice ==
Because ground conditions can vary greatly, equipment choice is extremely important. Add to this the fact that the races are relatively short and that equipment changes are allowed during races and equipment selection can get fanatical. Since tubular tires are popular in professional and some amateur racing and tires cannot easily be removed from the rim, collections of wheels with tires installed, are required for the varying conditions. It is common for racers even at an amateur level to have a pair of race bikes (one to ride and one in the pits as a back-up) and several wheels to choose from. At the professional level it is essential to have several bikes and wheel options available.

More recently, tubeless clincher tires have become popular after their successful presence on mountain bikes for the last several years. Advantages include lower overall wheel weight (no inner tube), lower tire pressures allowing for more traction without risk of a 'pinch flat' and no glue as required for tubular tires. Not all clincher rim designs allow for tubeless tires as an air tight contact surface is required to prevent the unintended loss of tire pressure.

== Rules ==
The following are rules that have been put in place by the UCI that are either specific to or have particular effect on cyclo-cross bicycles. These rules are not exhaustive, are only for UCI-sanctioned events and may not be enforced at all cyclo-cross events.

- Handlebars must not measure more than 50 centimetres (20 in) in width.
- Tire width may not exceed 33 millimetres (1.3 in) and tires may not feature any kind of studs or spikes.
- Wheels shall have at least 12 spokes.
- The weight of the bicycle cannot be less than 6.8 kilograms (15 lb to two significant figures).

As of 2010, disc brakes have recently been allowed for UCI races.

== Non-racing use ==
Some cyclocross bicycles available in the consumer market are supplied with disc brakes as a stock item. Some models include braze-ons to enable the use of cantilever style brakes instead. The growing popularity of disc brakes on cyclocross bicycles has allowed for improved and lighter rim designs due to a lack of brake track on the side of the rim.

== Mountain bikes in cyclocross racing ==
In some countries (including the United States, so long as it is not a UCI event) riders are also permitted to race in cyclo-cross events using mountain bikes (generally without bar ends), at least in low-level competition, but this is not currently allowed in events on the international calendar. It has been known for local races to be won on mountain bikes, particularly if the course is technical with little road or fast sections. However, for a traditional cyclo-cross course, a cyclo-cross bicycle is the most effective.

== See also ==
- All-rounder (cycling)
- Bicycle
- Cycle sport
- Cyclo-cross
- List of bicycle types
- Outline of cycling
- Gravel bicycle
