= Bar grip =

Tyre tread pattern

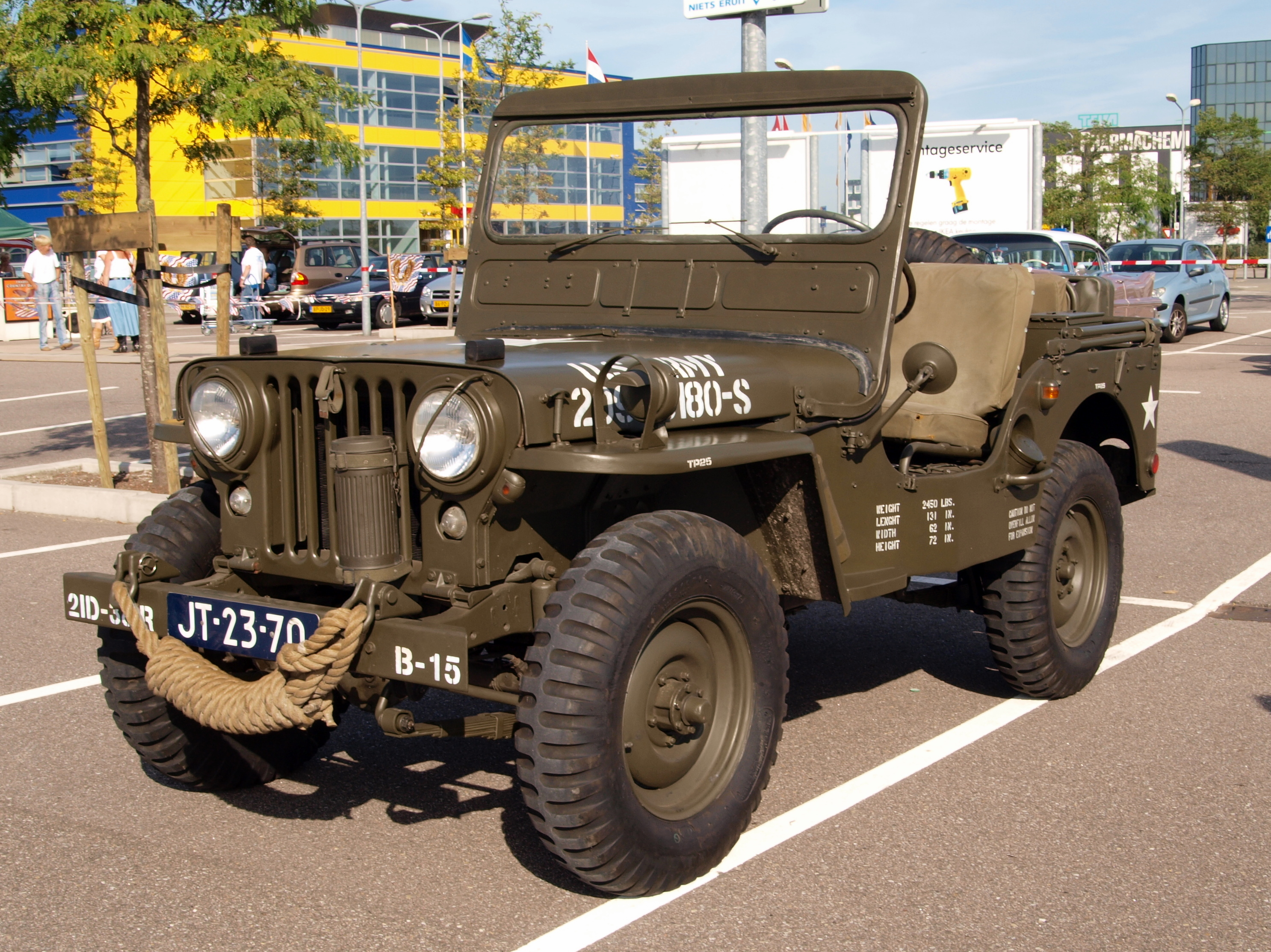
Willys M38 Jeep with bar grip tyres

Bar grip tyres, or 'NDT' (Non-Directional Tire) in US military parlance, are an early tyre tread pattern developed for off-road use.

Bar grips are characterised by a solid rubber circumferential centre strip, with large solid cleat alternately to either side. These span the full width of the tread. It is characteristic of this pattern that they do not have any tread pattern or sipes cut into the rubber to clear water.

Bar grip tyres were developed in the 1930s and were the standard military pattern throughout World War II, for vehicles from Jeeps to heavy trucks and armoured cars. They fell from favour in the 1970s and largely disappeared by the 1990s, having been replaced by newer patterns with better all-around performance.

== Development ==
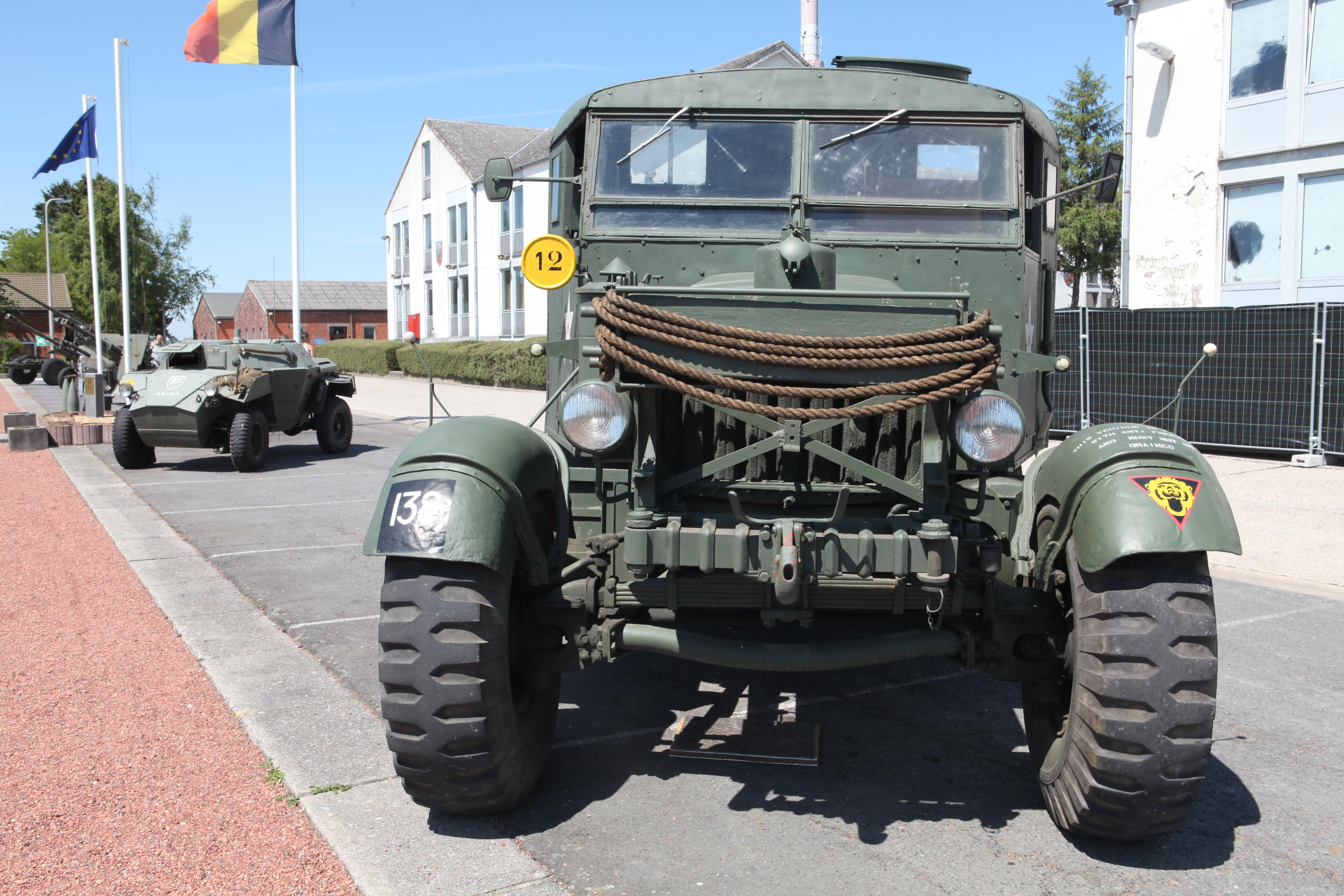
Scammell Pioneer on staggered bar grips

=== Early road patterns ===
Deliberate shaping of moulded tyre tread design, rather than merely concentrating on a rubber surface that didn't fail rapidly, began at the start of the 1920s. There was little theoretical background to this though until the mid-1920s. The 1922 London Motor Show displayed a range of tread patterns that were reported on by The Autocar. Some of these, from Miller and the French firm of Bergougnan, display what would now be recognised as the classic bar grip pattern of sharp-edged transverse bars with a wide central rib. However these were supplied for narrow high-pressure tyres, for use on roads and at relatively high speeds. Their design was based on simple notions of transverse bars giving fore-and-aft traction, without any developed theory of tread design or experimental measurements of their performance. In practice, such square-edged tread blocks wore badly and unevenly, the initially flat blocks tending to wear with a sloping top surface. This wear pattern was one reason for the practicing of rotating tyres between wheels, so that they spent equal periods wearing in each direction.

Later, and better, patterns were the Dunlop 'Traction' tread pattern of 1922 and the 'Triple stud' pattern of 1927. These followed the same principle of a solid central rib with square-edged blocks, but were developed to improve tread wear. The central rib became a thin and almost vestigial rib between square blocks. The side blocks were now isolated from the centre, although linked by another narrow rib, and their leading and trailing edges formed a trapezium rather than a square. This triple square stud pattern was a successful pattern for narrow tyres, including motorcycles, and remained popular from several manufacturers into the 1950s.

=== Off road use ===
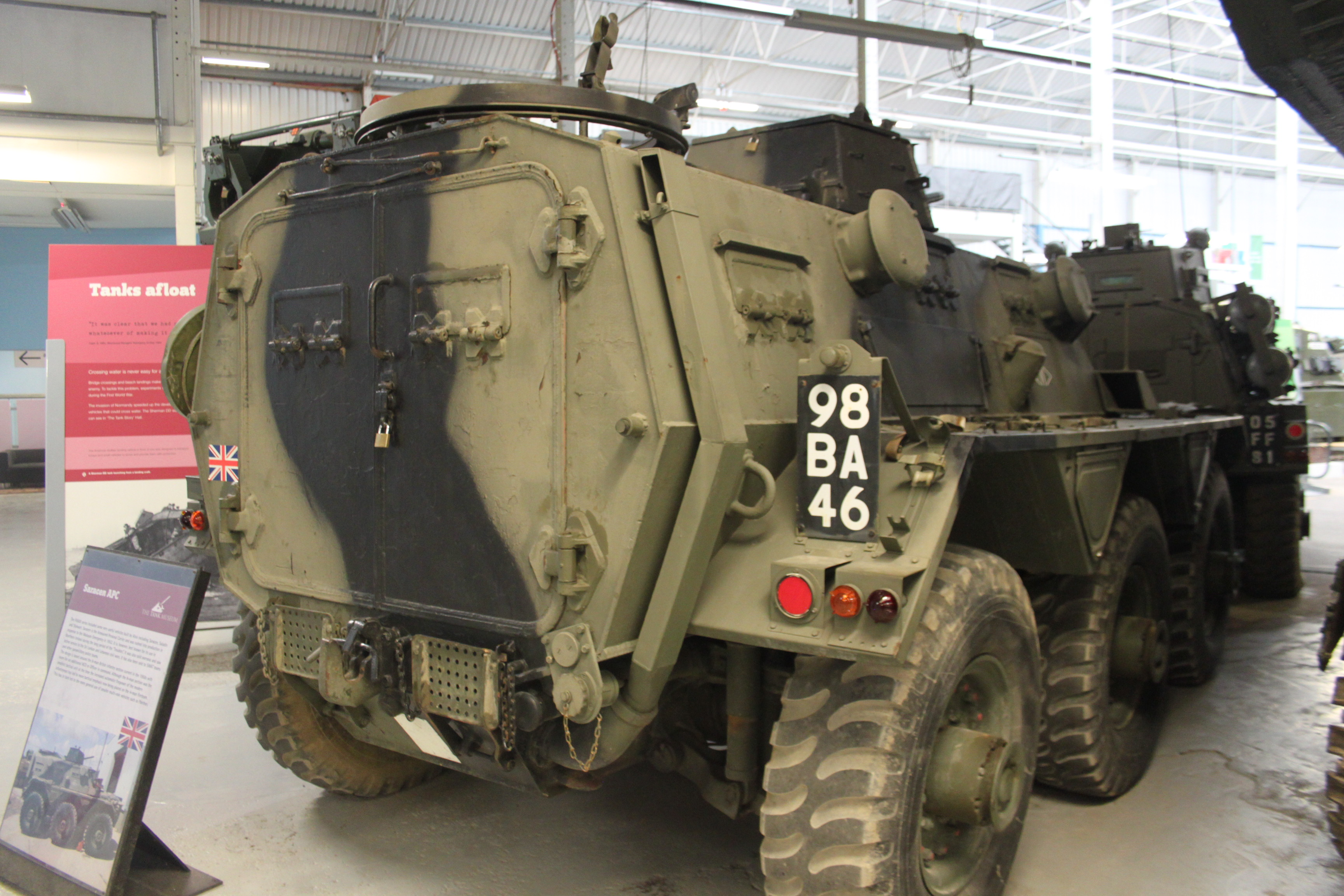
Alvis Saracen on late bar grips, with helical skew

The first deliberate uses of bar grip tyres as off-road tyres, were developed pre-war as truck tyres particularly for army use. They used crosswise tread bars for grip, arranged in a helical pattern. A helical pattern was used to avoid the uneven rolling radius and vibration of a tread with simple crosswise bars and large gaps between. This helical pattern also gave rise to a sideways force, particularly on tarmac. As all tyres had the same 'hand', this force increased across the two sides of the vehicle. To counteract this force, the central stop-rib was added. The stop-rib was only partly successful though; snowy conditions led the Swiss Post Office to use left- and right-handed tyres to balance the force across the vehicle. Later developments would use balanced arrangements of ribs in a chevron or herringbone layout. (Note: See Herringbone gear for a similar solution to axial thrust in gear transmissions.) The more common arrangement for the later low-speed military bar grip was to use straight bars, but relying on the centre rib to avoid their vibration problems on tarmac.

All bar grips are crossplies, having been developed when this was the only practical means of manufacturing tyres. The simple pattern of bar grips also made them easy to manufacture and hard-wearing, even if made from poor quality or ersatz rubber, bulked up with extreme quantities of non-rubber fillers.

== Drawbacks ==
Although the bar grip performs well as a pattern for severe mud, and is acceptable for most off-road surfaces, its lack of a small tread pattern makes it poor at clearing water. They are thus highly prone to aquaplaning on wet tarmac or smooth surfaces. They perform well on snow and carry chains well, but their large area of smooth unbroken rubber makes them poor performers on ice.

The small footprint of the bar grip tread makes them perform poorly on sand. Even in the 1930s, 'balloon' tyres with wider treads, smaller tread patterns and lower pressures, were available for desert use.

The poor water clearance of bar grips may limit their performance on very wet mud. With later patterns, such as the NATO, water may be squeezed out from between the blocks, leaving the mud drier and firmer. As the bar grip gives no escape for this water, they may retain a layer of water-lubricated mud like quicksand that remains extremely slippery.

== Replacement ==
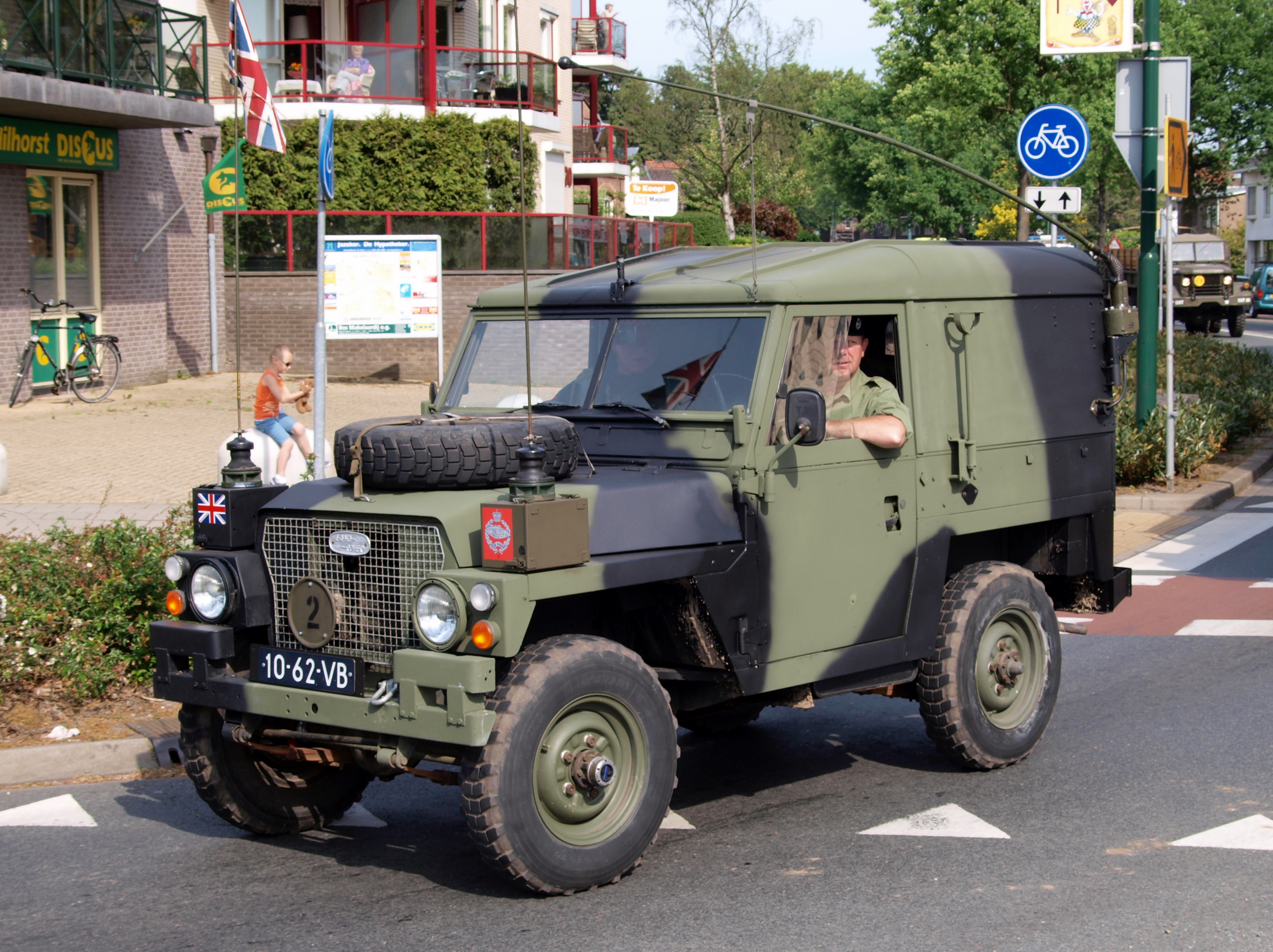
Land Rover on XCL pattern tyres

Bar grips were replaced on light vehicles such as Land Rovers and Jeeps in the 1970s, although they remained on heavy trucks. This was due to the faster speeds likely for light vehicles and the bar grip's poor tarmac performance. Developments in tyres, particularly the development of radial-ply tyres, also permitted a multi-purpose tyre that performed well both on and off-road.

The usual military replacement for a bar grip tyre today is now a pattern like the Michelin XCL or 'NATO Pattern', later the XZL. This consists of large solid rubber blocks, of similar size to the bar grip bars. These blocks are arranged in crosswise bars of three blocks, so that there is now good water clearance between blocks, both radially and axially. As the blocks are still large though and unsiped, water clearance from the block surface is still poor and the tyres still have a risk of aquaplaning on wet tarmac, compared to a typical road tyre. This pattern is also directional and so wheels should be mounted as either left-side or right-side.

== See also ==
- Grouser
- Paddle tire
