= Rolligon =

Trademark name for large tires suited for tundra

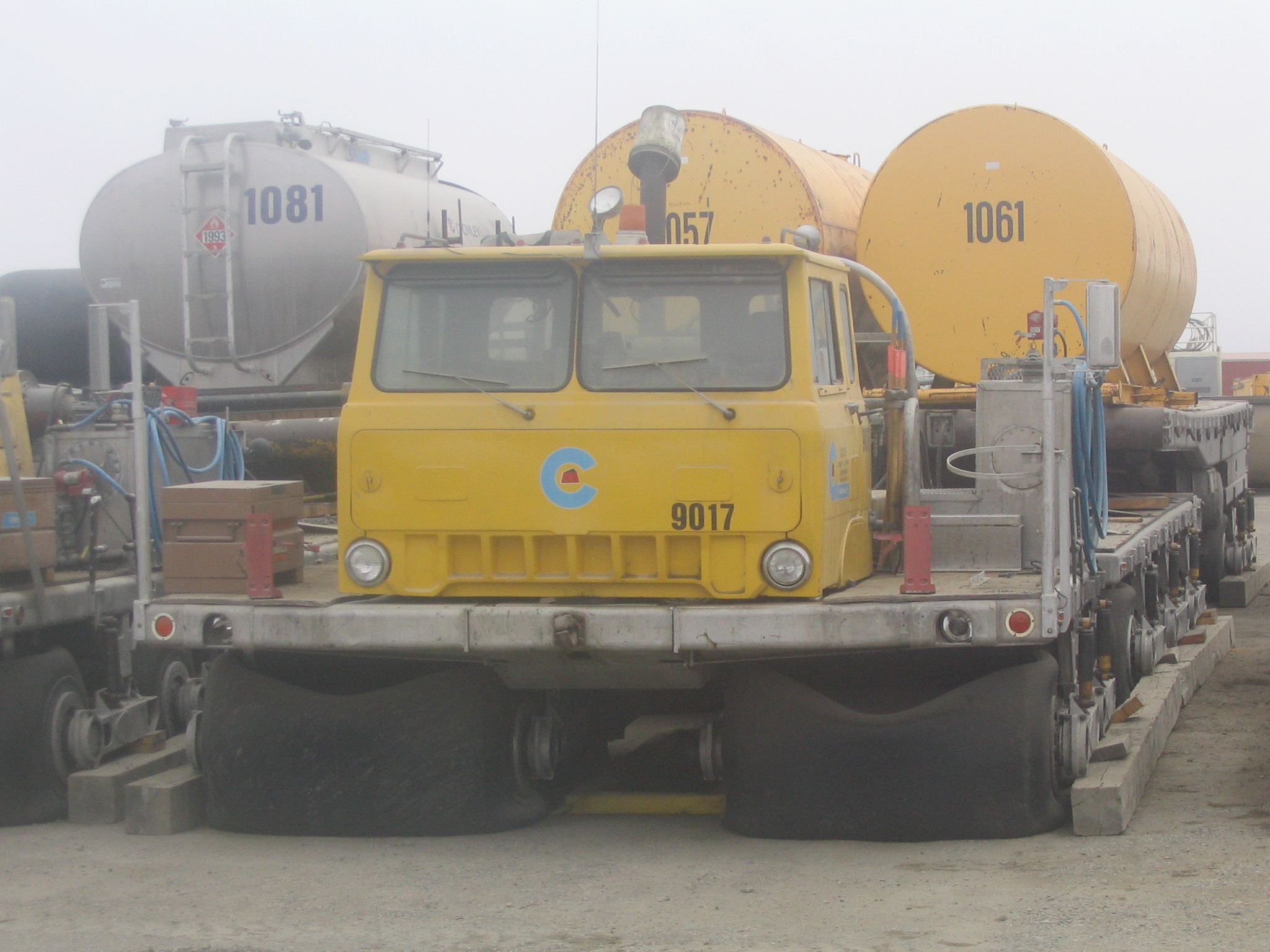
Tires inflated to 7 psi (48 kPa)

Rolligon is a trademark name for large, low-pressure tires, designed to traverse the soft ground surfaces of tundra. The product was invented by William Albee in 1951 after he had seen Inuit using inflated seal hides to drag a heavy boat on shore. Because the weight of the vehicle is spread over a much larger surface compared to conventional tires, the pressure is much lower. This prevents the vehicle from getting stuck, and limits damage to vulnerable plants of the tundra. With a tire pressure of up to 5 psi (34 kPa), the vehicles can traverse tundra at up to 16 kilometres per hour (9.9 mph). The vehicles are mainly used in the oil industry in Canada and Alaska.

The trademark is currently owned by NOV.
