= Mercedes-Benz EQ Silver Arrow 01 =

Formula E race car by Mercedes-Benz EQ

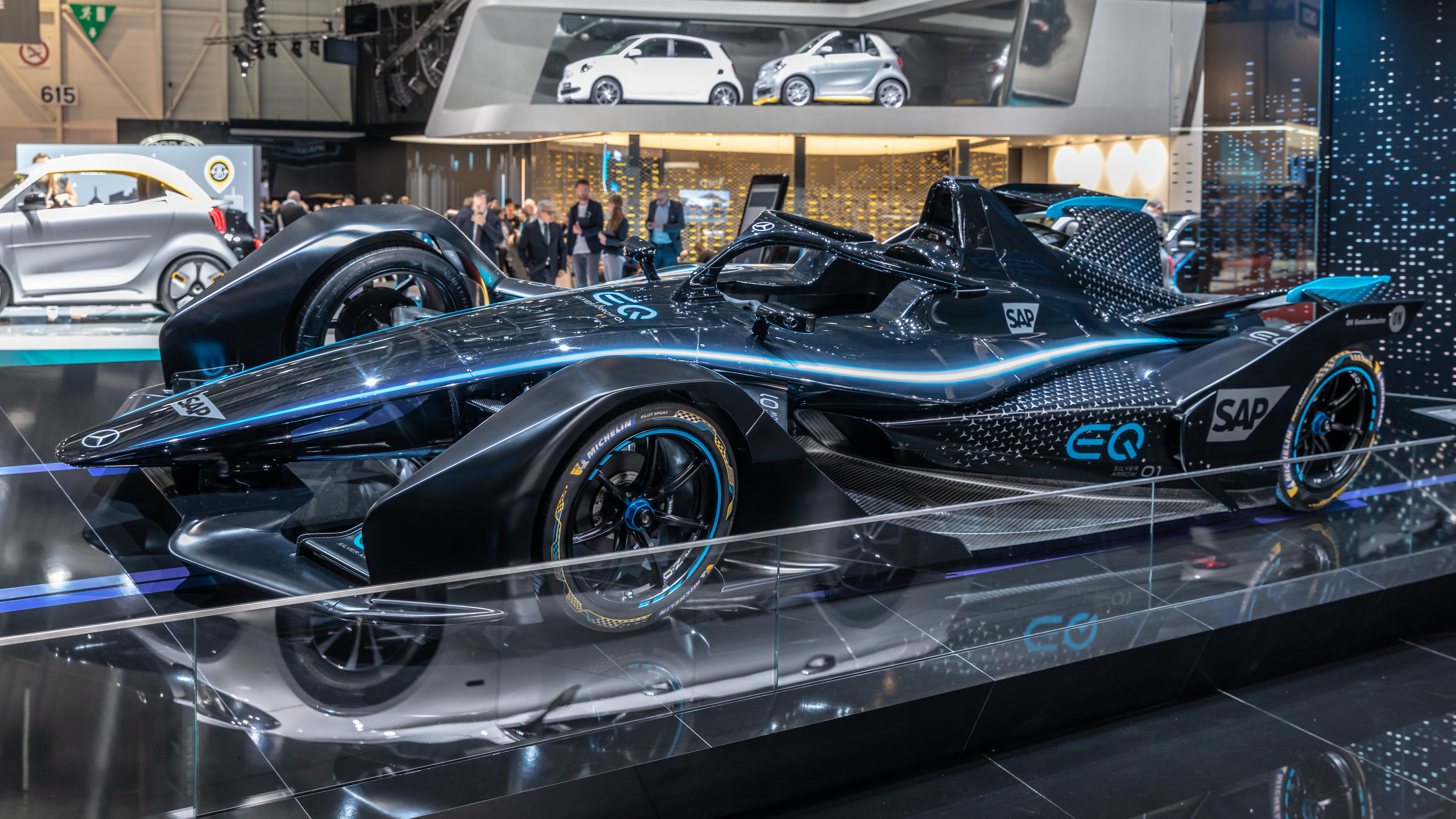
- The Mercedes-Benz EQ Silver Arrow 01 at the Geneva International Motor Show 2019.
- Successor: Mercedes-Benz EQ Silver Arrow 02

Technical specifications
- Chassis: Carbon fiber and aluminium monocoque
- Suspension: Double steel wishbones
- Length: 5,160 mm (203.1 in)
- Width: 1,770 mm (69.7 in)
- Height: 1,050 mm (41.3 in)
- Axle track: 1,553 mm (61.1 in) front 1,505 mm (59.3 in) rear
- Wheelbase: 3,100 mm (122.0 in)
- Engine: Rear-engine, rear-wheel-drive layout
- Weight: 900 kg (1,984 lb) (including driver)
- Brakes: Front: 278 mm Brembo carbon disks and calipers Rear: 263 mm Brembo carbon disks and calipers with brake-by-wire
- Tyres: 650 mm diameter front, 260 mm wide 690 mm diameter back, 305 mm wide Michelin Pilot Sport All-Weather Treaded, one set per weekend

Competition history
- Competition: Formula E
- Notable drivers: (Belgium) Stoffel Vandoorne (Netherlands) Nyck de Vries
- Debut: (Saudi Arabia) 2019 Diriyah ePrix
- First win: (Germany) 2020 Berlin ePrix
Entries	Wins	Podiums	Poles	F/Laps
11	1	4	1	1

The Mercedes-Benz EQ Silver Arrow 01 is a Formula E racing car developed by the Mercedes-Benz EQ Formula E Team for competition in the FIA Formula E Championship.

Built for the championship's Gen2 era, the car uses the standardized Spark SRT05e chassis, while Mercedes designed and produced its own electric powertrain components, including the motor, inverter, transmission, and software systems.

== Background ==
The Mercedes-EQ Formula E Team was started following the manufacturer's takeover of HWA Racelab. Rather than forming a team from scratch, Mercedes built on HWA's existing infrastructure.

The car was unveiled in March 2019 wearing a black “teaser” livery similar to the HWA chassis already competing in Formula E, and was displayed at several promotional events, including the 89th Geneva International Motor Show. In September 2019, Mercedes revealed their metallic silver livery and confirmed Danish wind power company Vestas as the team's principal partner. That same month, Mercedes also announced it would supply its powertrain to Venturi Racing.

== Complete Formula E Results ==
The Mercedes-Benz EQ Silver Arrow 01 made its competitive debut at the 2019 Diriyah ePrix. The car was driven by Stoffel Vandoorne and 2019 FIA Formula 2 Champion Nyck de Vries, with Ian James as team principal.

In pre-season testing at Circuit Ricardo Tormo, Mercedes came second-to-last, only outpacing the two NIO 333 drivers and one of the TAGHeuer Porsche Formula E Team drivers. Despite this, Vandoorne won one of two simulation races that were held during the week.

Prior to the season resuming after the COVID-19 pandemic, Mercedes introduced an updated black livery to align visually with its Formula One Mercedes-AMG F1 W11 EQ Performance car. The season concluded on a high note in Berlin, where the EQ Silver Arrow 01 achieved its first and only Formula E victory with a one-two finish; Vandoorne winning the race and de Vries securing second place. Vandoorne finished second in the Drivers’ Championship, while Mercedes finished third in the Teams’ Championship.

No.	Drivers	1	2	3	4	5	6	7	8	9	10	11	Points		T.C.
		DIR		SCL	MEX	MRK	BER		BER		BER				**3rd**
5	(Belgium) Stoffel Vandoorne	3	3	6	NC	15	6	5	Ret	12	9	**1**	**147**	**87**	**3rd**
17	(Netherlands) Nyck de Vries	6	16	5	Ret	11	4	Ret	18	4	14	2	**147**	**60**	**3rd**

Note

- Result in bold – Driver got pole position
- Result in italics – Driver got fastest lap
