= Formula E car =

Type of electric auto racing car

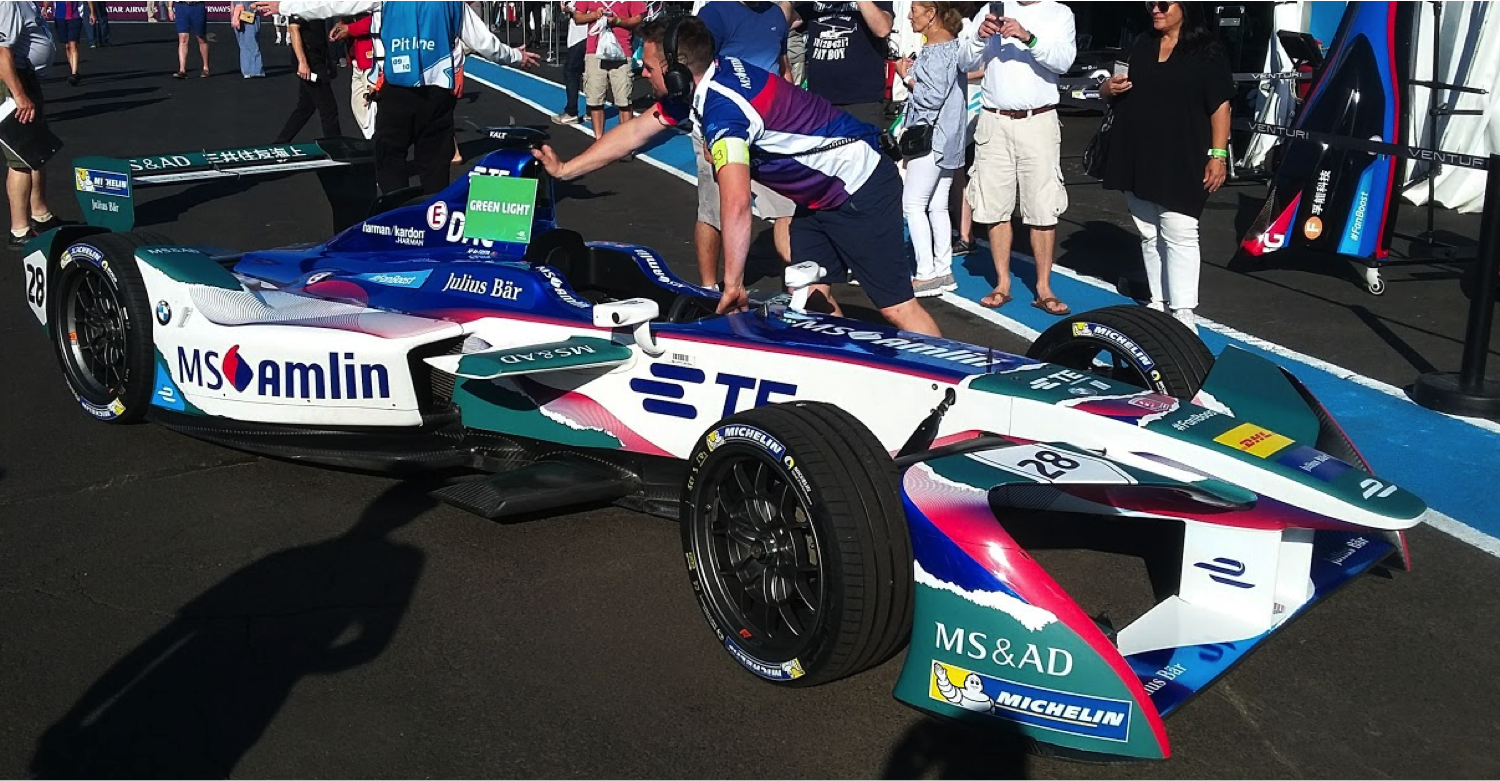
António Félix da Costa's Andretti-BMW car at the 2017 New York City ePrix

A Formula E car is a battery electric open-wheel auto racing car made according to the regulations of the International Automobile Federation (FIA) to take part in the FIA Formula E Championship. Races are mainly driven on closed temporary street circuits designed specifically for this racing category.

== Generations ==
As of 2026 there have been three major generations of Formula E cars, with a fourth generation planned to begin for the 2027 season. Every two seasons, an updated "Evo" version of the current generation is implemented, often with a more powerful motor system and improved aerodynamics. Due to the COVID-19 pandemic, the Gen2Evo was never raced, though renders exist of what the car would've looked like:

- Gen1
  - Season 1: 2014–15
  - Season 2: 2015–16
- Gen1Evo
  - Season 3: 2016–17
  - Season 4: 2017–18
- Gen2
  - Season 5: 2018–19
  - Season 6: 2019–20
  - Season 7: 2020–21
  - Season 8: 2021-22
- Gen3
  - Season 9: 2022-23
  - Season 10: 2023-24
- Gen3Evo
  - Season 11: 2024-25
  - Season 12: 2025-26
- Gen4
  - Season 13: 2026-2027

== 1st generation (2014–15 to 2017–18) ==
Spark-Renault SRT 01E
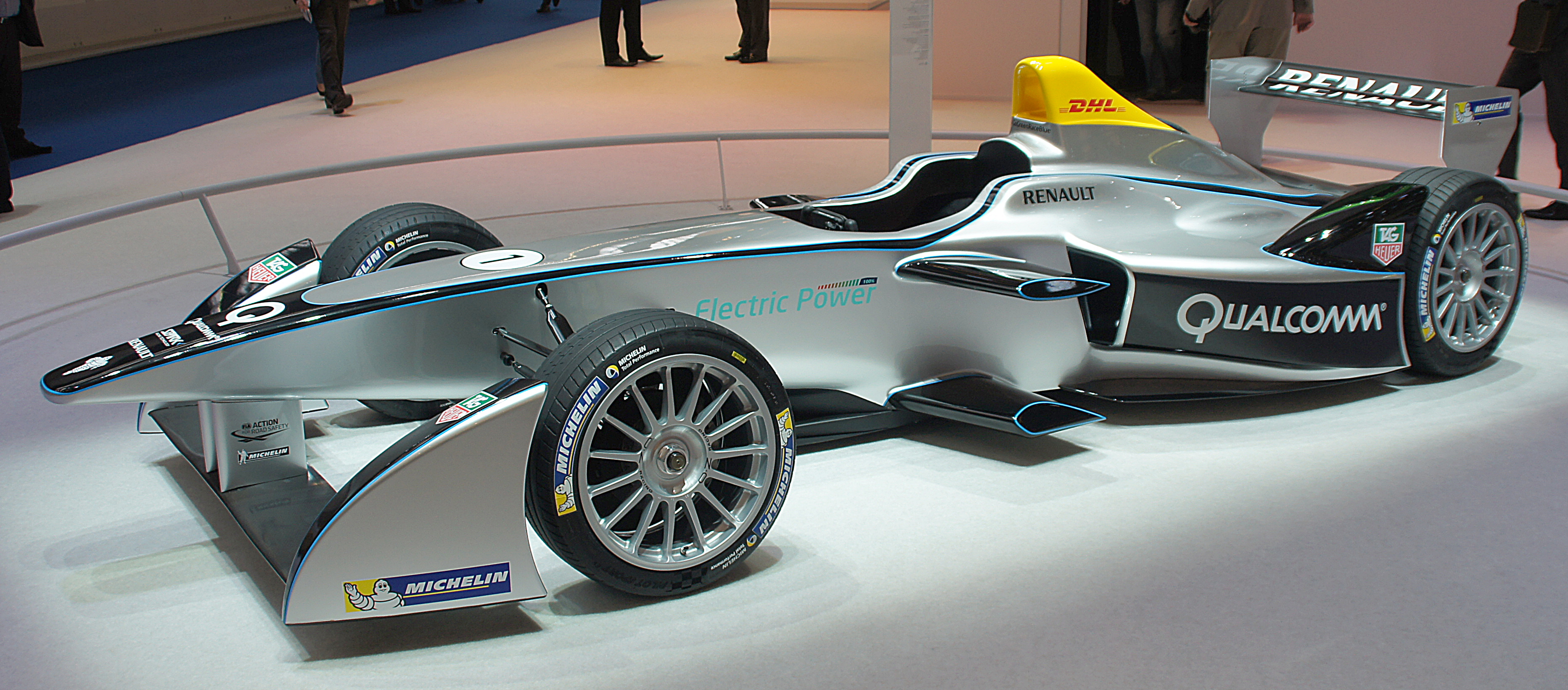
- Category: Formula E

Technical specifications
- Chassis: Carbon fiber and aluminium monocoque
- Suspension (front): Double steel wishbones, pushrod operated with twin dampers and torsion bars
- Suspension (rear): Spring
- Length: 5,000 mm (196.9 in)
- Width: 1,800 mm (70.9 in)
- Height: 1,250 mm (49.2 in)
- Axle track: 1,300 mm (51.2 in)
- Wheelbase: 3,125 mm (123.0 in)
- Electric motor: Season 1: McLaren Electronic Systems Season 2 onwards: various rear-mid mounted
- Transmission: Season 1: Hewland 5-speed sequential gearbox Season 2 onward: various
- Battery: 28 kWh Lithium-ion by Williams Advanced Engineering
- Power: Peak: 308 hp (230 kW; 312 PS); Qualifying: 268 hp (200 kW; 272 PS); Race: 201–242 hp (150–180 kW; 204–245 PS)
- Weight: 898 kg (1,980 lb) including driver
- Tyres: Treaded Michelin (dry and wet conditions)

Competition history

Even though the FIA originally planned for the category to be open to various chassis manufacturers, the only licensed Formula E model for the inaugural season (2014–2015) was the Spark-Renault SRT 01E. The electric components were assembled by Renault while the chassis was designed by Dallara, and the car was assembled by Spark Racing Technology.

In Season 2 (2015–16), the SRT_01E was opened up for private development of the motor, gearbox and rear suspension by the teams.

The specifications for the Spark-Renault SRT_01E are:

1st generation Formula E car
Property	Value
Acceleration	3 s from 0–100 km/h (approximately)
Top speed	225 km/h (FIA regulated)
Body material	Kevlar and carbon fiber
Aerodynamic elements	Spoiler and airdam
Gearbox controls	Semi-automatic wheel-placed paddle shifters
Shock absorbers	Torsion bars and springs
Brakes	Disks and calipers of any material. Round sections in aluminium alloy
Rims	460 mm (18 in) diameter Magnesium OZ Racing rims
Tires	650 mm diameter front, 260 mm wide 690 mm diameter rear, 305 mm wide

== 2nd generation (2018–19 to 2021–22) ==
Spark-Renault SRT05E
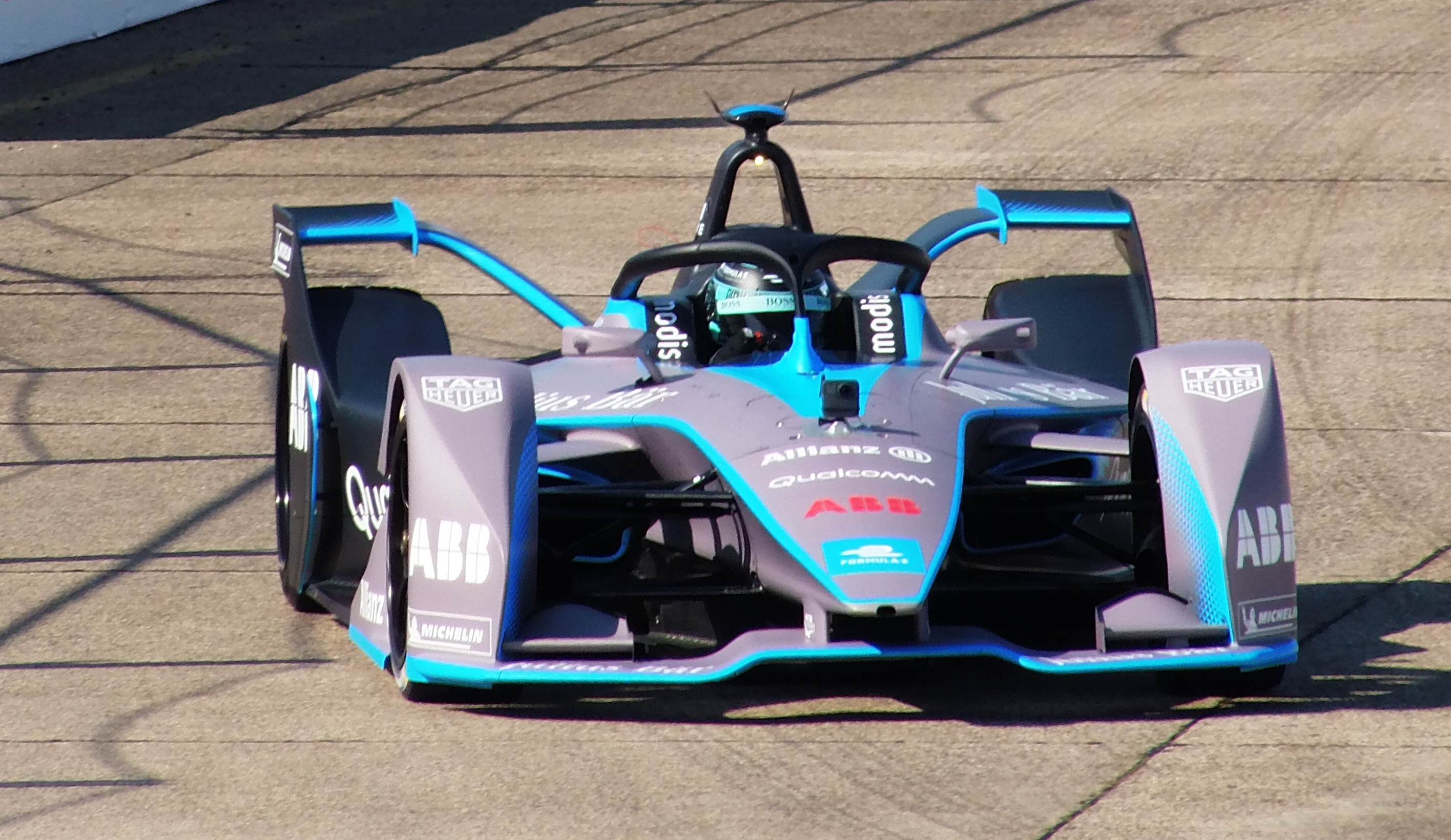
- Category: Formula E

Technical specifications
- Chassis: Carbon fiber and aluminium monocoque
- Suspension: Double steel wishbones
- Length: 5,160 mm (203.1 in)
- Width: 1,770 mm (69.7 in)
- Height: 1,250 mm (49.2 in)
- Axle track: Front: 1,553 mm (61.1 in); Front: 1,505 mm (59.3 in)
- Wheelbase: 3,100 mm (122.0 in)
- Electric motor: Various rear-mid mounted
- Transmission: Various
- Battery: 54 kWh by McLaren Applied Technologies
- Power: Peak: 335 hp (250 kW; 340 PS); Attack Mode: 302–335 hp (225–250 kW; 306–340 PS); Race: 242–268 hp (180–200 kW; 245–272 PS)
- Weight: 900 kg (1,984 lb) including driver
- Brakes: Front: 278 mm Brembo carbon disks & calipers; Rear: 263 mm Brembo carbon disks & calipers with brake-by-wire
- Tyres: Michelin Pilot Sport All-Weather Treaded

Competition history

In March 2016 it was decided by the FIA and Formula E Holdings that the upcoming 2nd generation cars would keep to a specification chassis in a bid to keep costs low in the category. The tender for the 2nd Generation car was won by Spark Racing Technology.

The original battery specifications requested in the tender included a 200 kg (440 lb) cell-weight limit, a 200 kW peak power limit, and a maximum usable energy of 28 kWh. For the 2018–2019 season, the specifications for the battery was a weight of 385 kg (849 lb) and 54 kWh energy, and peak power was 250 kW. The cells (18650VTC6) was to be made by Murata Manufacturing, the integration by Lucid Motors, and track handling by McLaren.

Also new for the generation 2 cars was the inclusion of a halo crash protection device.

A refreshed 'Gen2 Evo' car was planned to be introduced for the 2020-2021 season, but was cancelled due to the disruptions caused by the COVID-19 pandemic and was instead replaced with the Gen 3 car.

The specifications for the Spark SRT05e are:

2nd generation Formula E car
Property	Value
Acceleration	2.8 s from 0–100 km/h (approximately)
Top speed	280 km/h (FIA regulated)
Body material	carbon fiber
Aerodynamic elements	Spoiler and airdam
Energy source	54 kWh battery by McLaren Applied Technologies
Shock absorbers	Torsion bars and springs
Rims	460 mm (18 in) diameter rims
Tires	650 mm diameter front, 260 mm wide 690 mm diameter back, 305 mm wide, one set per weekend
Mass	900 kg total mass (included driver) 385 kg battery mass

== 3rd generation (from 2022) ==
Formula E Gen 3
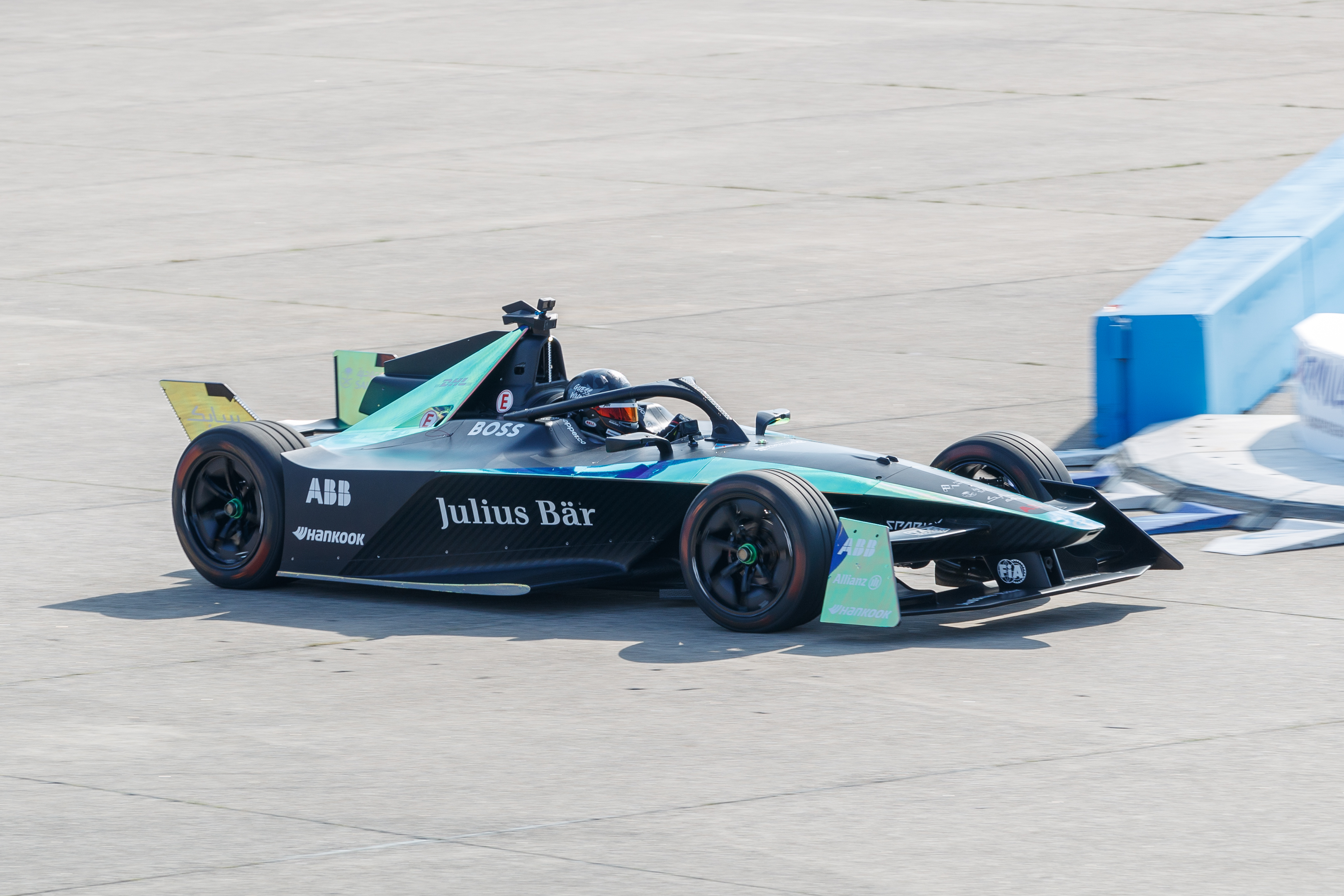
- Category: Formula E

Technical specifications
- Chassis: Carbon fiber and aluminium monocoque
- Length: 5,016 mm (197.5 in)
- Width: 1,700 mm (66.9 in)
- Height: 1,023 mm (40.3 in)
- Wheelbase: 2,970 mm (116.9 in)
- Electric motor: Spec Atieva front-mounted, various rear-mid mounted
- Transmission: Various
- Battery: 47 kWh by WAE Technologies
- Power: Peak: 469 hp (350 kW; 476 PS); Race: 402 hp (300 kW; 408 PS)
- Weight: 840 kg (1,852 lb) including driver
- Brakes: Front: disks & calipers; Rear: Brembo single-use emergency disc brake
- Tyres: Hankook all-weather treaded

Competition history

The 3rd generation of Formula E cars are lighter and smaller than the 2nd generation cars to allow for more wheel-to-wheel racing. It will be the first formula car with both front and rear powertrains, with a 250 kW motor-generator on the front axle being used for regenerative braking and a 350 kW motor on the rear axle powering the vehicle. It will be the first formula car not to feature rear hydraulic brakes, and will instead rely on the regenerative capabilities of the engines for braking on the rear wheels, with only a single-use emergency disc brake system to save weight. It is claimed that "at least 40% of the energy used within a race will be produced by regenerative braking during the race". This contributes to the car, at the time of launch in 2022, being claimed as becoming the world's most energy efficient race car ever. Performance-wise, the 3rd generation Formula E cars are expected to achieve around 2 to 4 seconds faster lap times in both qualifying and races compared to the 2nd generation cars.

After 2 seasons, the car was upgraded to the Gen3 Evo model, which features grippier Hankook tires and the use of the front motor to deploy 67 hp (50 kW) for all-wheel drive traction in qualifying and Attack Mode to address criticisms about poor grip and the weak effect of Attack Mode in the initial seasons. Additionally, the front wing was replaced with a more robust design.

The specifications for the 3rd generation Formula E cars are:

3rd generation Formula E car
Property	Value
Top speed	320 km/h (FIA regulated)
Body material	Linen and carbon fiber, of which some is recycled carbon fibre from retired Gen2 cars
Aerodynamic elements	Spoiler and airdam
Energy source	Battery cells with sustainably-sourced minerals; reused and recycled at end of life 600 kW total power potential from regenerative braking (250 kW front motor, 350 kW rear motor)
Fast charging	600 kW ultra-high speed charging
Rims	460 or 510 mm OZ Racing magnesium wheels
Tyres	Tyre compound with 26% natural rubber and recycled fibres; recycled after racing

== 4th Generation (2026 onwards) ==
The Generation 4 car is set to make its race debut at the 2026/27 season. It will run in permanent four-wheel-drive specification as opposed to the current car, where four-wheel drive is only active in the duel phase of qualifying, the race start, and in attack mode.

== Transmission ==
During the first season in 2014–2015, all teams used a Hewland 5-speed sequential gearbox operated by the driver semi-automatically via paddles on the steering wheel similar to other racing series. In the following seasons, regulations on gearboxes have been relaxed, and some teams have chosen to use either single-speed gears or all the way up to four gears. A transmission with multiple gears can help keep the motor in its most efficient operating range, but whether an electric car needs multiple gears in the transmission depends heavily on the torque curve of the motor at different rotational speeds (r/min). By season 4 in 2017–2018, all teams were running single-speed gearboxes. Some single-speed Formula E cars have sometimes erroneously been described as having a "direct-drive" powertrain. However, FIA regulations for the gen 1 and 2 car have mandated a reduction gear, and Formula E cars without multi-speed gearboxes have thus far had a single-speed gear rather than a true direct-drive mechanism. Gen 4 cars will run in permanent four-wheel-drive specification as opposed to the current car, where four-wheel drive is only active in the duel phase of qualifying, the race start, and in attack mode.

== Sound ==
The second generation Formula E car from 2017 had a noise level of about 80 decibels, which is 10 dB louder than an average petrol road car or about as loud as a domestic vacuum cleaner.

== See also ==
- Formula E
  - 2014–15 Formula E Championship
  - 2015–16 Formula E Championship
  - 2016–17 Formula E Championship
  - 2017–18 Formula E Championship
  - 2018–19 Formula E Championship
  - 2019–20 Formula E Championship
  - 2020–21 Formula E World Championship
  - 2021–22 Formula E World Championship
  - 2022–23 Formula E World Championship
  - 2023–24 Formula E World Championship
