= Racing slick =

Type of tire used in auto racing

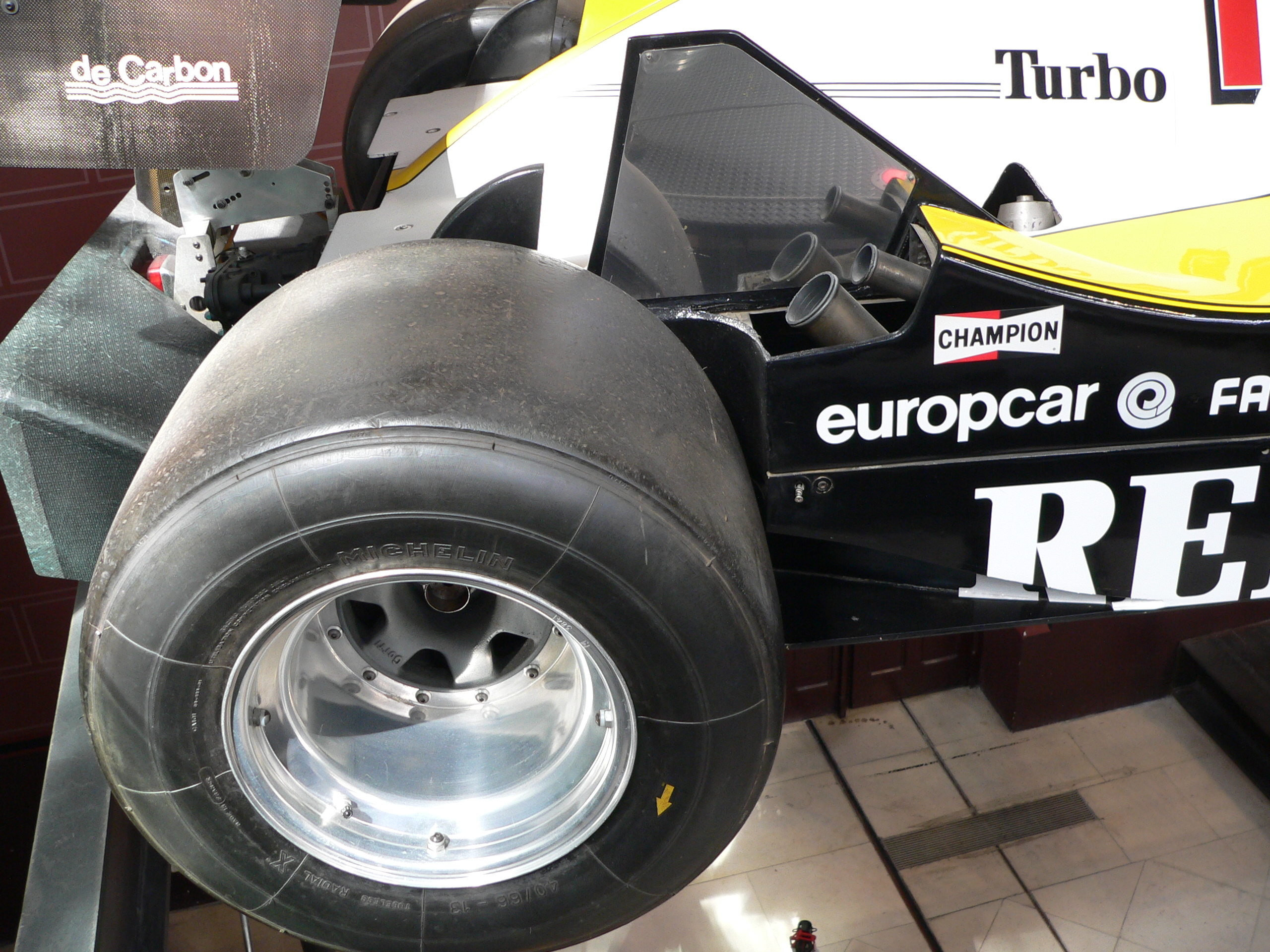
Tyre on Alain Prost's 1983 Renault Formula One racing car

A racing slick or slick tyre is a type of tyre that has a smooth tread for use on paved surfaces in road racing and drag racing events. The first production slick tyre was developed by M&H Tires in the early 1950s for use in drag racing. By eliminating any grooves cut into the tread, such tyres provide the largest possible contact patch to the road, and maximize dry traction for any given tyre dimension. Slick tyres are used on race tracks and in road racing, where acceleration, steering and braking require maximum traction from each wheel. Slick tyres are typically used on only the driven (powered) wheels in drag racing, where the only concern is maximum traction to put power to the ground, and are not used in rallying.

Slick tyres are not suitable for use on common road vehicles, which must be able to operate in all weather conditions. They are used in auto racing where competitors can choose different tyres based on the weather conditions and can often change tyres during a race.

== Performance ==
Two stress mechanisms produce tyre grip:

- Indentation of the viscoelastic tyre rubber adapting to the texture of the road surface
- Molecular adhesion at the interface between the tyre rubber and the road surface

Slick tyres can provide far more traction than grooved tyres on dry roads, but typically have far less traction than grooved tyres under wet conditions. Wet roads severely diminish the traction because of aquaplaning due to water trapped between the tyre contact area and the road surface. Grooved tyres are designed to remove water from the contact area through the grooves, thereby maintaining traction even in wet conditions.

Since there is no tread pattern, slick tyre tread does not deform much under load. The reduced deformation allows the tyre to be constructed of softer compounds without excessive overheating and blistering. Modern day slick tyres have now developed particular performance qualities in a specific window of temperatures, becoming sticky when accumulating enough heat, and thus give much greater adhesion to the road surface, but they also have lower treadwear ratings; i.e. they wear out much more quickly than the harder rubber tyres used for driving on the streets. It is not uncommon for drivers in some auto sports to wear out multiple sets of tyres during a single day's driving.

== Drag racing slicks ==
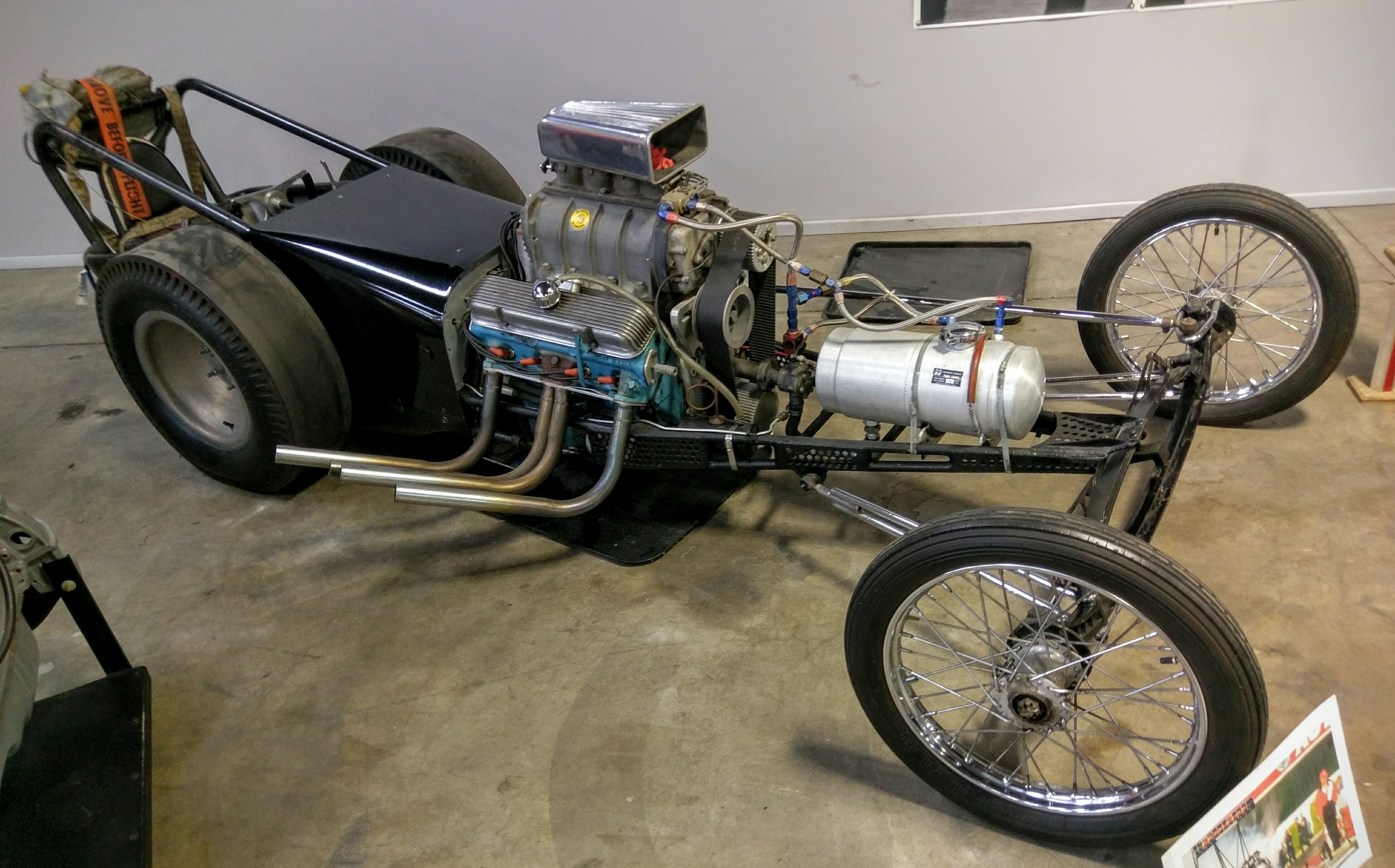
A 1958 Fuel dragster (technically, a rail), on display at the California Automobile Museum

The first drag racing slick was developed by M&H Tires (Marvin & Harry Tires) in the early 1950s. It was the only company in the world that produced and sold original drag racing tyres.

Drag racing slicks vary in size, from slicks used on motorcycles to very wide ones used on "top fuel" dragsters. For "closed wheel" cars, often the car must be modified merely to account for the size of the slick, raising the body on the rear springs for the height of narrower slicks, or replacing the rear wheel housings with very wide "tubs" and narrowing the rear axle to allow room for the wider varieties of tyres. Open-wheel dragsters are freed from any such constraints, and can go to enormous tyre sizes. Some use very low pressures to maximize the tread contact area, producing the typical sidewall appearance (when the car is launching off the line and the tire is under heavy torque load, not when at rest or at speed) which leads to their being termed "wrinkle wall" slicks. Inner tubes are typically used, to ensure that the air does not suddenly leak catastrophically as the tyre deforms under the stress of launching.

"Wrinkle Wall" slicks are now specifically designed for the special requirements of drag racing, being constructed in such a way as to allow the sidewall to be twisted by the torque applied at launch, softening the initial start and thus reducing the chances of breaking traction. As speed builds, the centrifugal force generated by the tyre's rotation "unwraps" the sidewall, returning the energy to the car's acceleration. Additionally, it causes the tyres to expand radially, increasing their diameter and effectively creating a taller gear ratio, allowing a higher top speed with the same transmission gearing.

=== Cheater slicks ===
Since completely slick tyres are outlawed on most roads due to their inability to handle wet pavement, the "cheater slick" became a popular item in the hot rod world in the 1960s; a typical slick type tyre, but engraved with the absolute minimum amount of tread grooves required to satisfy legal requirements. Since then, however, tyre development has progressed greatly, so that today's hot rod street cars typically use wide, grooved tyres which perform better than the slicks of the past; while the cheater slicks available today, both for nostalgic appearance of street cars and for competition use in classes where legal street tyres are required, have followed their own line of development, diverging from true slick tyre construction to become a distinct tyre design in themselves.

== R compound tyres (grooved slicks) ==
The development in cheaper slick technology has affected the development of tyres for racing series other than drag racing as well. When other forms of auto racing similarly instituted classes which require DOT approved street tyres, some manufacturers similarly began to market tyres which superficially resembled their high performance street tyres, but with the least tread pattern permissible and with very soft, sticky rubber, intended specifically for competition because the soft tread would wear too quickly for street use. These became known as R compound tyres. With additional years of progress, this class of tyre has followed its own line of development, to the point where they have little in common with true street tyres of the same brand. This has led to new classes of racing which require not only DOT approval, but also a minimum treadwear rating, in an effort to eliminate the R compound tyres from competition and require "true" street tyres.

== Formula One ==
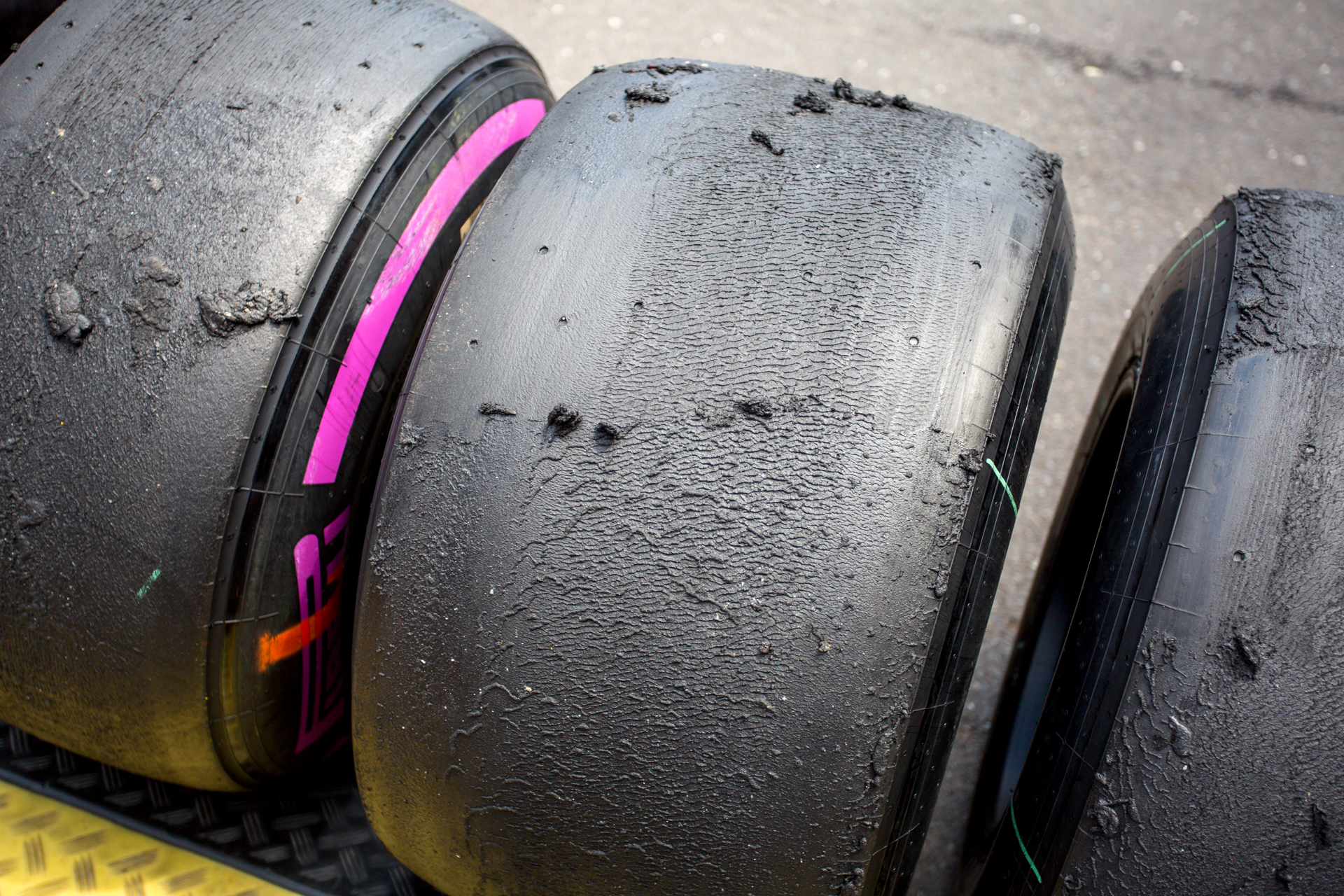
Pirelli ultrasoft slick tyres seen at the 2016 Austrian Grand Prix. The tyre wear is clearly visible.

In Formula One, slick tyres were introduced by Firestone at the 1971 Spanish Grand Prix. They were banned from the 1998 to 2008 seasons. Dry weather tyres with mandatory circumferential grooves intended to reduce total grip and reduce cornering speeds were used, but were still often referred to as "slicks" as the grooves were not intended to disperse water and could not be used effectively in wet conditions. Slick tyres were reintroduced from the 2009 season.

== Bicycle tyres ==
In contrast, many bicycle tyres made for street use are slick. Aquaplaning does not present a problem for bicycles tyres due to their narrower width, higher pressure, lower speed, and circular cross section (due to the need to lean the bicycle in turns); the bicycle tyre can penetrate the water layer to contact the road much more easily. In practice, grooved bicycle tyres do not outperform slick tyres on wet roads. However, many low and medium performance bicycle tyres have substantial tread depth, because the bicycles are designed with off-road excursions in mind: in dirt, gravel or sand, the tread pattern provides significantly improved traction. In addition, high-performance bicycle tyres, although designed for road use only, often have a very fine tread pattern, which appears to provide no difference in performance versus a slick tyre and is only there for marketing purposes and as a tyre-wear indicator. This is clear not only from direct testing of tyres, but also from the fact that the texture of the road is itself coarser than the minimal tread pattern on these tyres. Some grooveless designs have small "holes" or dimples embedded in the tread as a tyre-wear indicator. This is similar to automobile tyre-wear indicator bars, which contact the road when the tyre is worn to a low tread amount, making the tyre noisy on the road.

== See also ==
- Indentation hardness
