= Plus sizing =

Practice of fitting larger wheels with low-profile tires

Plus sizing is the practice of replacing an automotive wheel with one of a larger diameter fitted with a new tire of lower aspect ratio so that the new tire has close to the same diameter and circumference as the original tire to minimize any changes in speedometer accuracy, torque and traction control, while reducing sidewall flex and (generally) increasing cornering ability.

The number following the "plus" describes the number of inches which is added to the diameter of the rim. For example, plus one sizing means increasing the wheel by 1 inch (25 mm) – i.e. from a 15 to 16 in (380 to 410 mm) rim size.

A "plus zero" upgrade means changing to a wider tire size while using the same diameter wheel.

Changing to a wider tire requires reducing the aspect ratio (the second number in the sequence of numbers that describes the tire's size). Since the aspect ratio is a percentage which is used to calculate the height of the tire's sidewall, it follows that if a larger number is used for the width, a smaller number must be substituted if the final result is to remain the same—which is the objective of Plus sizing.

== Plus sizing example ==
Original tire	Plus zero	Plus one	Plus two
205/60R16	215/55R16	215/50R17	235/40R18

These are simply examples and do not represent all the possible combinations which could achieve the same result. For an R16 tire, 195/65, 205/60, 215/55, 225/55, 235/50, 245/50, 255/45, 265/45, 275/45 and 285/40. width/aspect ratio tires have essentially the same diameter.

The exact dimensions of tires in the same size might differ slightly depending on tire brand, model, etc.

== Advantages ==
- Larger tires improve handling and cornering, due to wider tread faces and stiffer sidewalls.
- Wider tires may decrease braking distances on dry pavement.
- Wider tires may also increase acceleration, especially in very powerful vehicles such as muscle cars.
- Larger wheels with lower profile tires are sometimes aesthetically desirable.

== Disadvantages ==
- Larger wheels typically cost more. Wider tires tend to be more expensive because they are less common, and there is less competition between brands.
- Performance improvements beyond what is achieved in a Plus One sizing are often minimal.
- Lower profile tires tend to have stiffer sidewalls, which might decrease riding comfort.
- Low profile tires are likely to sustain more damage to tires and wheel rims when encountering road debris and potholes.
- Larger and wider wheels decrease fuel efficiency and increase consumption. A test done on Volkswagen Golf 2.5 saw a 10% decrease in fuel efficiency from 23.3 to 21.1 U.S. miles per gallon (from 10.1 to 11.2 liters per 100 km) in a Plus Four sizing.
- Larger and wider wheels may also degrade acceleration on many everyday vehicles. The test done on a Volkswagen Golf 2.5 saw a 0.3 second degradation in 0 to 60 mph (0 to 97 km/h) acceleration from 7.6 seconds to 7.9 seconds in a Plus Four sizing. Although this is likely caused by the 14 lb (6.4 kg) weight difference, per corner, in "unsprung weight".
- A larger tire-footprint can increase the time taken for "return to center" (steering) after taking a sharp turn.

== Controversial issues ==
Some people claim larger wheels wear faster. Wheels with reduced sidewall heights may increase risk of damaged rims, breaking the bead, and/or damaged sidewalls. The increased width of the contact patch of wider tires may increase the risk of hydroplaning.

Plus sizing tires may enhance the vehicle's value. Improving the vehicle from the factory specifications may increase value.

The additional height and weight of plus-sized wheels may reduce vulnerability to rollovers, particularly by changing the center of gravity. During rapid tire deflation at speed, reduced sidewall height may decrease rollovers.

Total wheel weight (tyre & rim) represents "unsprung" weight. Standard fit wheels and tyres tend to have less unsprung weight than oversized rims and tyres. With less unsprung weight, the shock absorbers and dampers are much better able to control the lower inertia and consequently, the vertical "bounce" of a wheel over a bumpy road surface, resulting in better and more consistent tyre contact with the road surface.

== See also ==
- Tire code
- Uniform Tire Quality Grading (UTQG)
- Wheel sizing
