= Uniform Tire Quality Grading =

Standards for passenger car tires

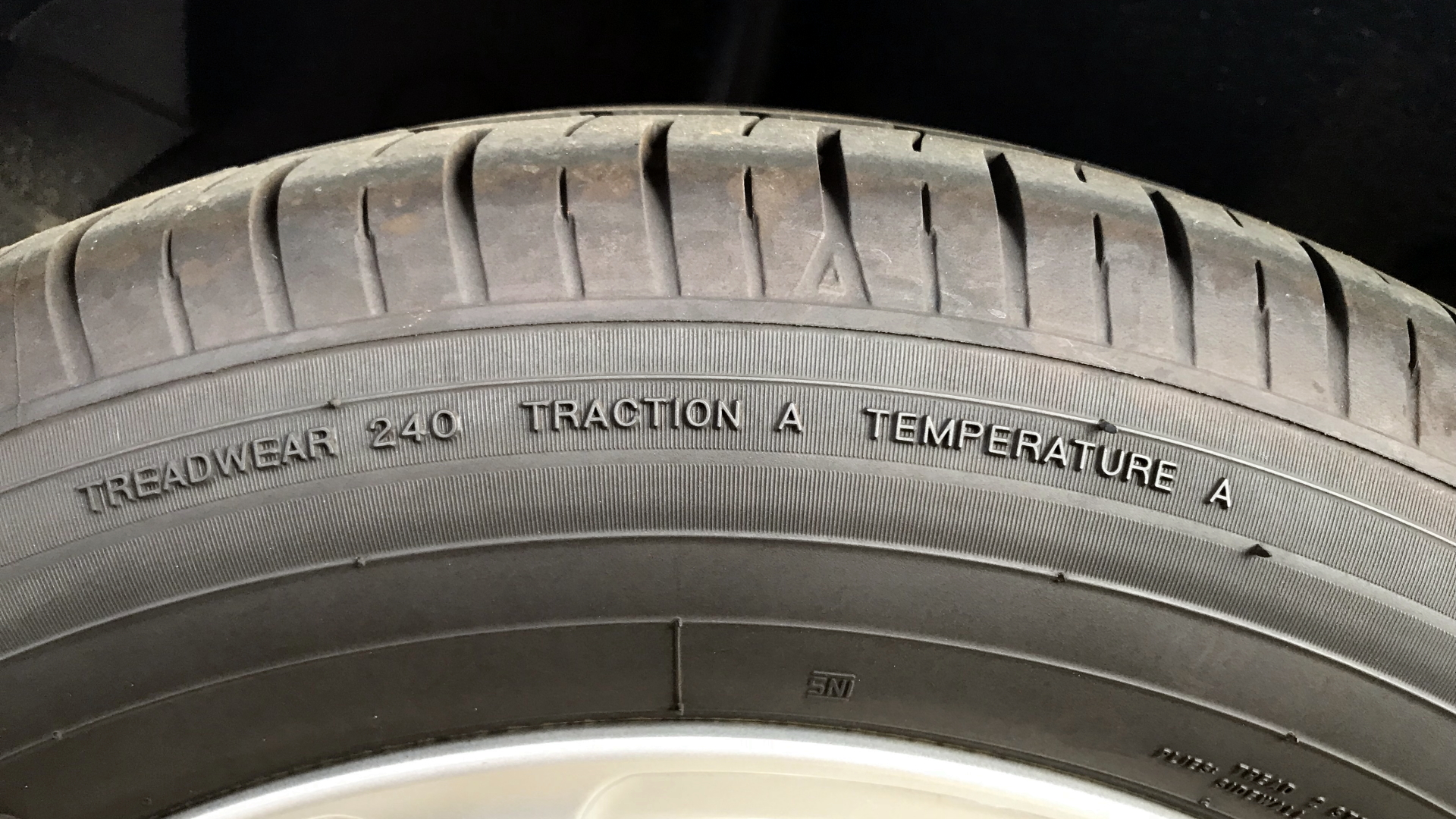
UTQG ratings on sidewall of Toyo Tires Proxes R39 tire

UTQG ratings (top) and tire code (bottom) on sidewall of Continental ContiProContact tire

Uniform Tire Quality Grading, commonly abbreviated as UTQG, is a set of standards for passenger car tires that measures a tire's treadwear, temperature resistance and traction. The UTQG was created by the National Highway Traffic Safety Administration in 1978, a branch of the United States Department of Transportation (DOT). All passenger car tires manufactured for sale in the United States since March 31, 1979 are federally mandated to have the UTQG ratings on their sidewall as part of the DOT approval process, in which non-DOT approved tires are not legal for street use in the United States. Light truck tires are not required to have a UTQG. It is not to be confused with the tire code, a supplemental and global standard measuring tire dimensions, load-bearing ability and maximum speed, maintained by tire industry trade organizations and the International Organization for Standardization.

The National Highway Traffic Safety Administration (NHTSA) established the Uniform Tire Quality Grading Standards (UTQGS) in 49 CFR 575.104. When looking at UTQG ratings it is important to realize that the Department of Transportation does not conduct the tests. The grades are assigned by the tire manufacturers based on their test results or those conducted by an independent testing company they have hired. The NHTSA has the right to inspect tire manufacturers' data, and can fine them if inconsistencies are found.

The NHTSA published DOT HS 812 325 “Consumer Guide to Uniform Tire Quality Grading” August 2016, which provides rating information.

Dedicated winter tires, also known as snow tires, are not required to have a UTQG rating. Non-passenger car tires, such as those for motorcycles, buses, medium trucks and above along with trailers are also not required to have a UTQG rating, although FMVSS Standard 109 requires the following to be listed on the tire's sidewall: speed restriction if less than 55 mph, regroovable if designed for regrooving, and a letter designating load range rating.

== Components ==
The UTQG rating is made up of three components, treadwear, traction and temperature.

=== Treadwear ===
The treadwear grade is a comparative rating based on the wear rate of the tire when tested under controlled conditions on a specified government test track. A tire graded 200 would last twice the distance on the government test course under specified test conditions as one graded 100. In theory, this means that a tire with a 200 grade will wear twice the distance as a tire with a 100 grade. However, tire manufacturers are not under any obligation to grade a tire based on the test results, except to say that they cannot overstate the grade. This is enforced by NHTSA requiring documentation to justify any assignment of a grade on a tire, "These treadwear grades are no guarantee of actual tire mileage; differences in driving habits, service practices, climate, and road characteristics will affect a tire's longevity."

As Course Monitoring Tires have changed, their treadwear grades have changed to numbers considerably higher than 100. As a result, it would be incorrect to say that a tire with a treadwear grade of 200 gets twice the life of the Course Monitoring Tire.

==== Methodology ====
The wear on tires that are being tested ("candidate tires") is compared to the wear of Course Monitoring Tires (CMT), which are sold by the NHTSA at its UTQG test facility in San Angelo, Texas. Both types of tires are mounted on vehicles that will be driven in a convoy during the test, thus ensuring that the candidate tires and the CMT tires experience the same road conditions. The convoy, typically comprising four or fewer vehicles, will drive 7200 miles on public roads in West Texas. Candidate tire wear will be checked during and after the test, and compared to the wear on the CMT tires from the same convoy.

The first CMTs were commercially available Goodyear Custom Steelguards, and Goodyear Tire and Rubber Company produced all CMT tires from 1975 until 1984. From 1984 to 1991, the CMT tires were produced by Uniroyal. CMT tires are now "specially designed and built to American Society for Testing and Materials (ASTM) standard E1136 to have particularly narrow limits of variability." 1.

==== Relation to friction coefficient ====
A study has shown a statistical relationship between the average friction coefficient (μ) and the treadwear rating of tires tested. This relationship can be represented by the following formula:

$$\mu =\frac{2.25}{TW^{0.15}}$$

Generally speaking, a lower treadwear rating correlates with a higher friction coefficient and thus provides a shorter braking distance. A softer, more sticky tire, wears off its material faster to provide this performance.

However, this is an average rule, and for the same friction coefficient, the curve in this study shows large variations in treadwear rating, which decrease the significance of this relationship. Thus, depending on production method and tire model, the quality of rubber (thanks to certain additives) can multiply the treadwear rating by more than 3 without lessening the friction coefficient.

==== Limitations ====
The treadwear grade is a ratio and not a mileage. This is because multiple factors determine treadwear rates and most of them are a function of driving conditions and operating environment, and not the tire itself. As a result, actual tire wear will vary considerably within the same tire line. However, two tires with exactly the same compound should have a treadwear rating that varies in accordance with tread depth.

The assigning of UTQG grades is done solely by the tire manufacturer. In many cases, this has resulted in the UTQG grading system to be more of a marketing tool than was originally intended.

It is legal and permissible for a tire manufacturer to give a particular tire line a lower treadwear grade. For example, if the highest treadwear grade in a manufacturer's lineup is 600, then a tire line with a lower treadwear test result might receive a grade of 400, instead of the 480 it could possibly receive.

Also, it is common for tires whose treadwear grade is of little commercial value, such as racing tires, to be assigned extremely low values – sometimes even zero.

=== Traction ===
Traction grades, from highest to lowest, are AA, A, B and C. They represent the tire's ability to stop on wet pavement as measured under controlled conditions on specified government test surfaces of asphalt and concrete. The testing does not take into account cornering, hydroplaning, acceleration or stopping on a dry surface. Nor does it account for the significantly different effectiveness of ABS versus non-ABS braking systems on a tire's stopping distance.

The UTQGS traction test procedure measures a tire's coefficient of friction when it is tested on wet asphalt and concrete surfaces. The test tire is installed on an instrumented axle of a traction trailer, which is towed by a truck at 40 miles per hour (mph) over wet asphalt and concrete surfaces. The tow truck is equipped with an on-board water supply system that sprays water in front of the test tire. The brakes, from the test tire only, are momentarily locked, and sensors on the axle measure the longitudinal and vertical forces as it slides in a straight line. The coefficient of friction for the pair, test tire and surface, is then determined as the ratio of the longitudinal and vertical forces.

The UTQGS traction rating procedure specifies that the traction coefficients for asphalt and for concrete are to be calculated using the locked-wheel traction coefficient on the tire, or sliding coefficient of friction. More specifically, upon application of the brakes, the tire is subjected to shear between the wheel and the road surface, and deforms towards the rear of the vehicle. This generates a traction force to oppose the motion of the vehicle. As braking torque increases, the tire deforms more and tread elements near the rear of the contact patch with the road begin to slip rather than grip. The coefficient of friction rapidly reaches a maximum value at about 10-20 percent slip, and then declines as the longitudinal slip values increase to 100 percent, which represents a fully locked tire. The maximum coefficient of friction in the 0-100 percent slip range is termed "peak" coefficient of friction, and the lower coefficient value for the fully locked tire is termed "slide" coefficient of friction.

Traction Grades
| Grade | Asphalt g force | Concrete g force |
|---|---|---|
| AA | Above 0.54 | 0.38 |
| A | Above 0.47 | 0.35 |
| B | Above 0.38 | 0.26 |
| C | Less Than 0.38 | 0.26 |

=== Temperature ===
The temperature grades, from highest to lowest, are A, B and C. These represent the tire's resistance to the generation of heat at speed. Tires graded A effectively dissipate heat up to a maximum speed that is greater than 115 mph. B rates at a maximum between 100 mph and 115 mph. C rates at a maximum of between 85 mph to 100 mph. Tires that cannot grade up to C or higher cannot be sold in the US.

== See also ==
- Tire code
- Wheel sizing
- European Tyre and Rim Technical Organisation
- Tyre Label
