= Wheel sizing =

Measuring a wheel rim diameter to find the wheel's size

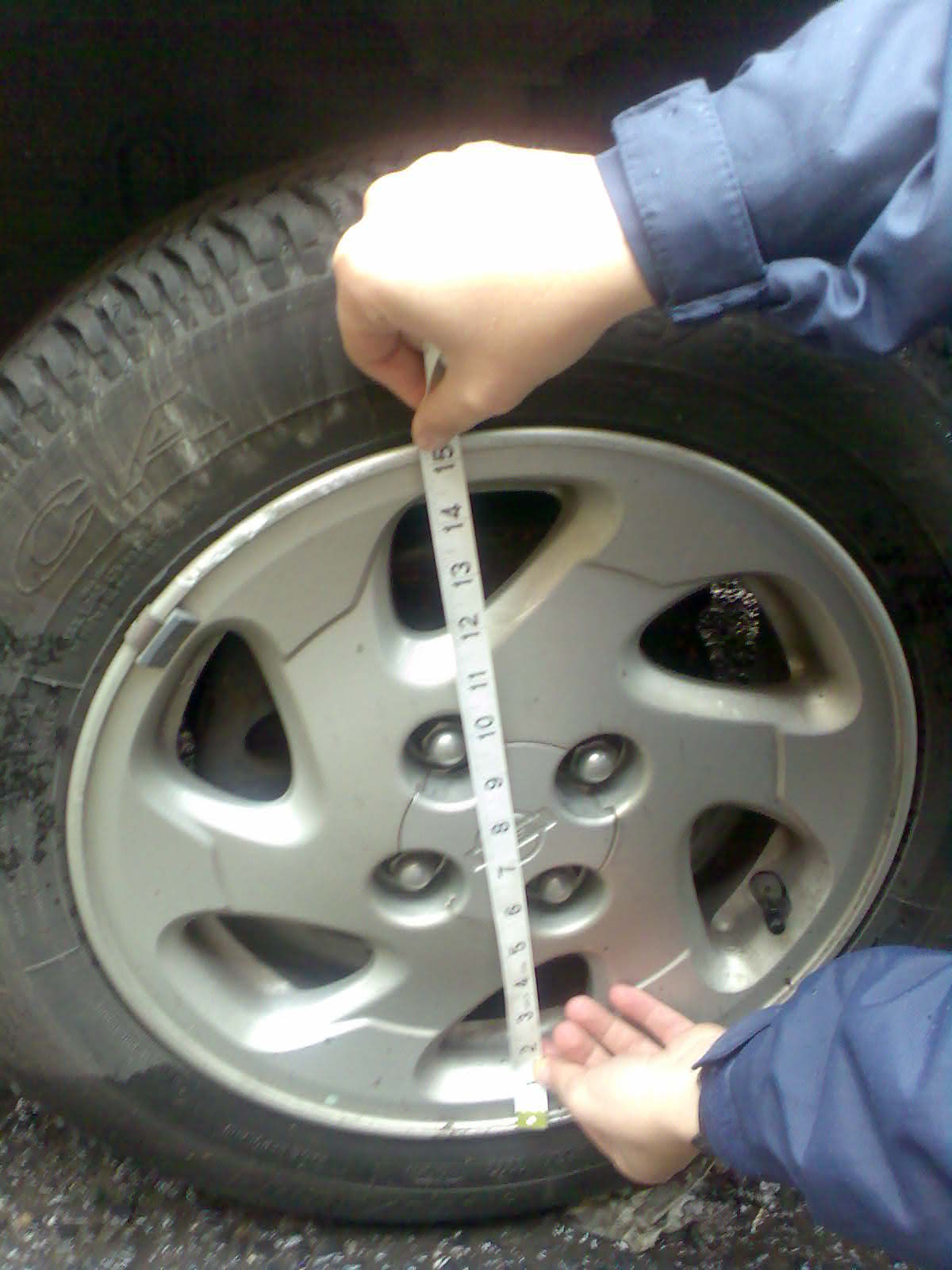
Measuring an outside rim diameter to approximate wheel size

The wheel size for a motor vehicle or similar wheel has a number of parameters.

== Units ==
The millimetre is most commonly used to specify dimensions in modern production, but marketing of wheel sizes towards customers is still sometimes done with traditional systems. For example, wheels for road bicycles are often referred to as 700C, when they actually measure 622 mm. Wheel diameters and widths for cars are stated in inches, while car tire bead diameters are stated in inches and widths are in millimetres.

== Wheel size ==
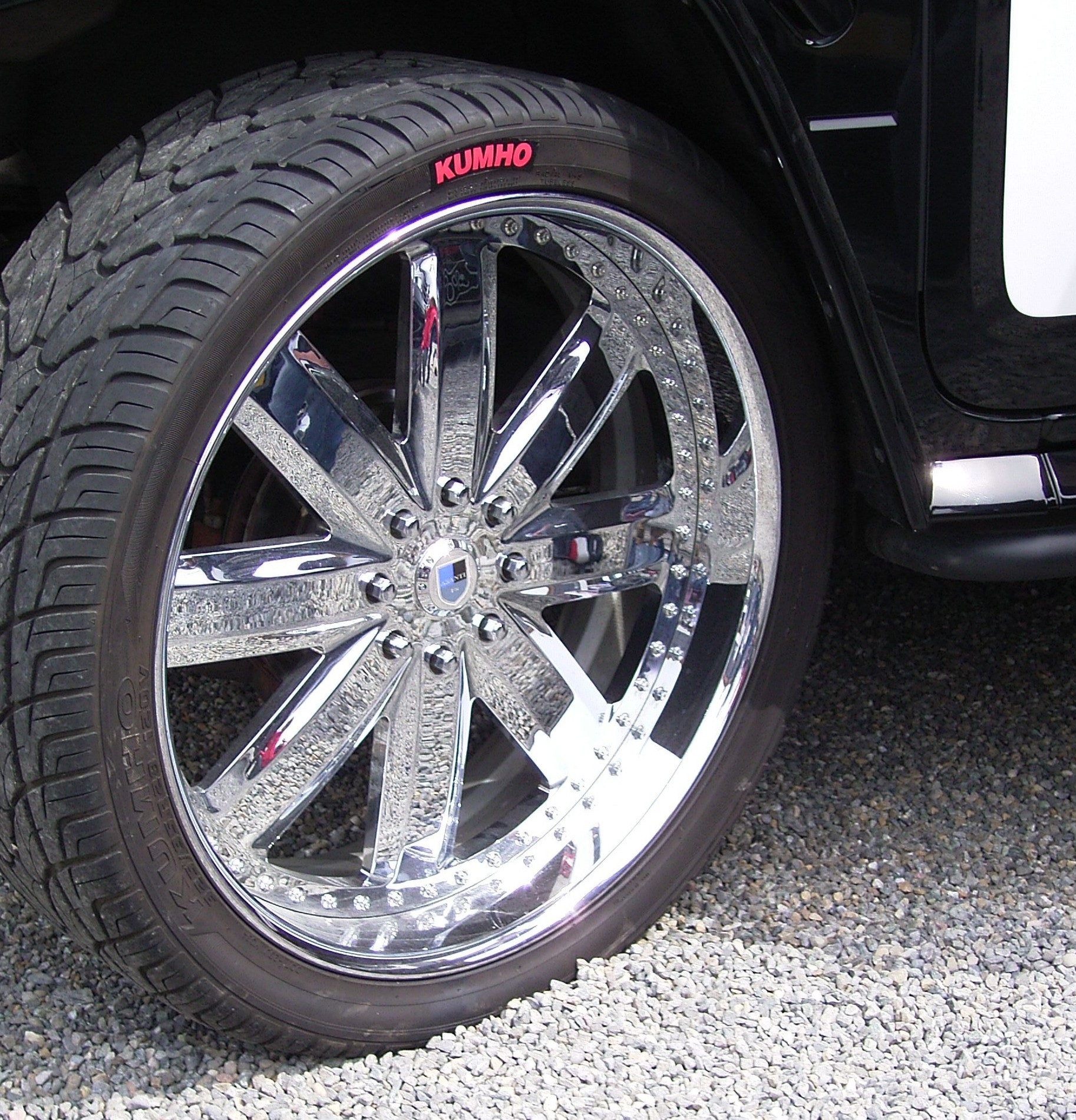
Wheels with Asanti 28 in (710 mm) rims on a police Hummer H2 car

The wheel size is the size designation of a wheel given by its diameter, width, and offset.

The diameter of the wheel is the diameter of the cylindrical surface on which the tire bead rides. The width is the inside distance between the bead seat faces. The offset is the distance from the wheel's true centerline (half the width) to the wheel's mounting surface. Offset is covered in more detail below. A typical wheel size will be listed beginning with the diameter, then the width, and lastly the offset (+ or - for positive or negative). Although wheel sizes are marketed with measurements in inches, the Michelin TRX introduced in 1975 was marketed in millimeters.

For example, 17 × 8.5 × +35 designates a diameter of 17 inches, width of 8.5 inches, and +35 mm positive offset (432 × 216 × +35 in fully metric numbers).

Replacing the wheels on a car with larger ones can involve using tires with a lower profile. This is done to keep the overall diameter of the tire the same as stock to ensure the same clearances are achieved. Larger wheels are typically desired for their appearance but could also offer more space for brake components. This can come at cost of performance though as larger wheels can weigh more.

Alternatively, smaller wheels are chosen to fit a specific style of vehicle. An example of this is the Lowrider Culture in which smaller wheels are largely desired.

Wheels can be widened to allow for a wider tire to be used and to poke the wheel out to the fender of the vehicle. Running a wider tire allows for more of the vehicle's power to be put to the ground because there is a larger surface area making contact with the road. This will improve a vehicle's performance when it comes to acceleration, handling, and braking.

=== Bolt pattern ===
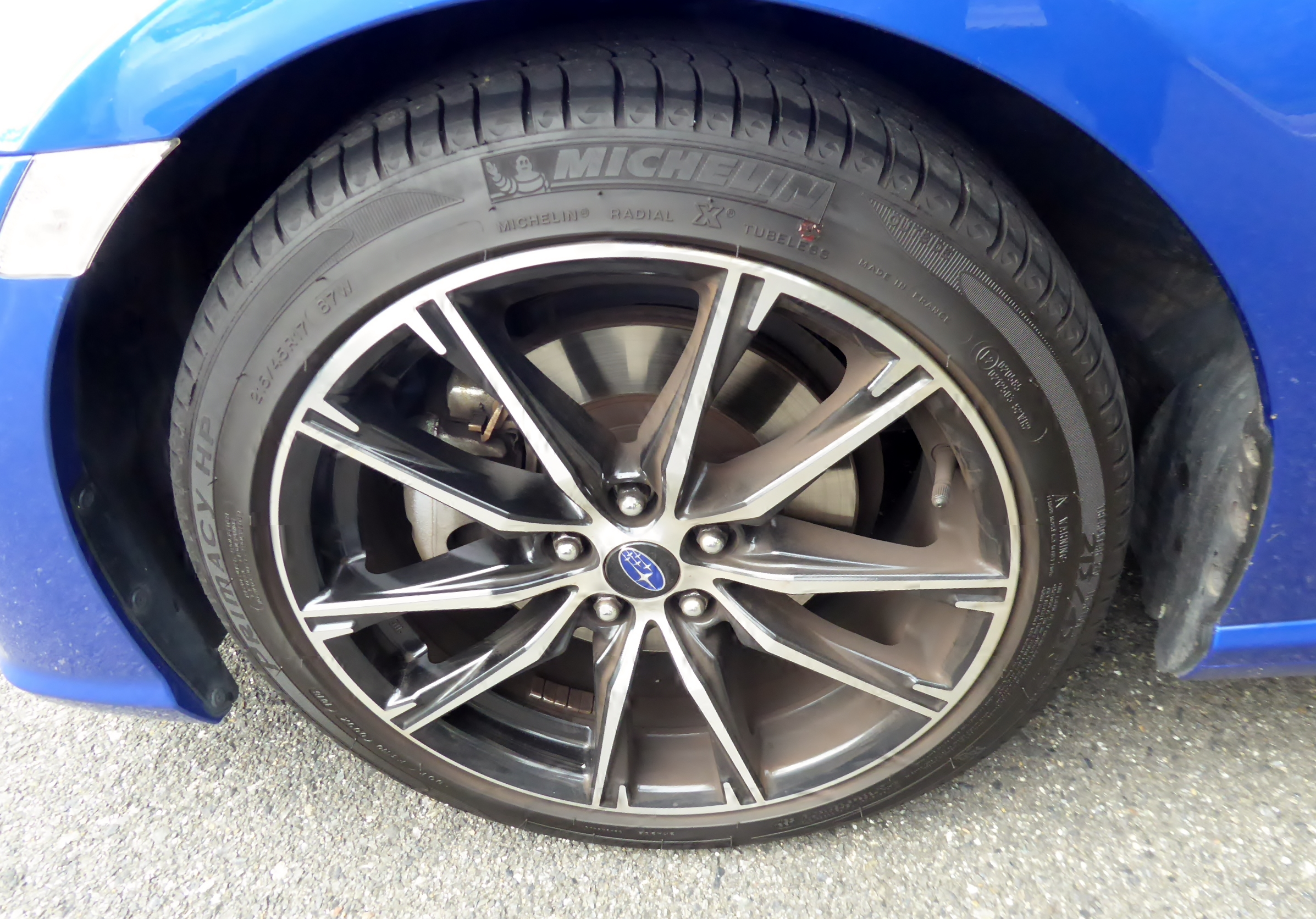
The tire wheel of Subaru BRZ S (DBA-ZC6) with optional parts

The bolt pattern determines the number and position of the bolt holes on the wheel to line up with your vehicle's studs on the mounting hubs. The bolt holes are spaced evenly about the bolt hole circle. Wheel studs are the bolts that are on your mounting hub and are used along with lug nuts to attach the wheel to the car. The bolt hole circle is the circle that the center of each bolt aligns with. The second number in a bolt pattern is the diameter of this circle. The bolt circle has the same center point as the mounting hub to ensure that the wheel will be concentric with the mounting hub. The bolt circle's measurement is called the bolt circle diameter (BCD), also called the pitch circle diameter (PCD).

The bolt circle diameter is typically expressed in mm and accompanies the number of bolts in your vehicle's bolt pattern. One example of a common bolt pattern is 5x100 mm. This means there are 5 bolts evenly spaced about a 100 mm bolt circle.

The picture to the right is an example of a 5×100 mm bolt pattern on a Subaru BRZ. The wheel has 5 lug nuts and utilizes a 100 mm bolt circle diameter.

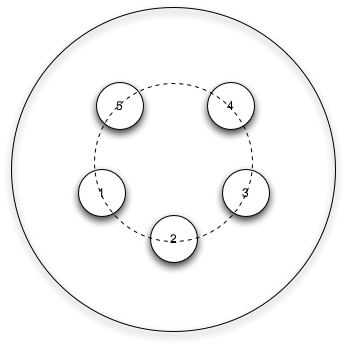
5-hole bolt pattern

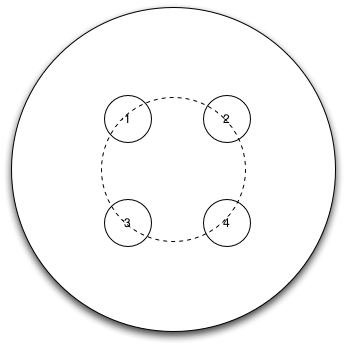
4-hole bolt pattern

Some of the most common BCD values are 100 mm (≈3.94 inches), 112 mm (≈4.41 inches), and 114.3 mm (4.5 inches). Always check your owner's manual or call your local car dealership to confirm the bolt pattern on your vehicle. Over the years, over 30 different bolt patterns have been used by car manufacturers, with most of the different bolt patterns being incompatible with each other.

List of different bolt patterns
4x095.25
4x098
4x100
4x108
4x114.3
4x130
5x098
5x100
5x108
5x110
5x112
5x114.3
5x115
5x118
5x120
5x120.6
5x120.65
5x127
5x130
5x135
5x139.7
5x150
5x160
6x114.3
6x115
6x125
6x127
6x135
6x139.7
8x165
8x170

=== Lug nuts and wheel studs vs. bolts ===
On vehicles with wheel studs, wheels must be fitted with the correct type of lug nuts. On vehicles without wheel studs, wheels must be fitted with the correct type of lug bolts.

Lug nuts (or bolts) will have either flat, tapered (conical), or ball (radius) seats. The type of seat a wheel requires will determine the appropriate lug nuts required to securely attach the wheel to the vehicle. A flat seat type has a flat end that puts pressure on the wheel and compress it against the mounting hub. Similarly, tapered and ball seat types have a conical or semicircular end, respectively. A place to find the lug nut type is to check OEM (Original Equipment Manufacturer) specifications if you have stock wheels or contact the wheel manufacturer if you have aftermarket wheels.

Some aftermarket wheels will only fit smaller lug nuts, or not allow an ordinary lug nut to be properly torqued down because a socket will not fit into the lug hole. Tuner lug nuts were created to solve this problem by utilizing a special key to allow removal and installation with standard lug wrench or socket. The design of tuner lug nuts can range from bit style to multisided or spline drive, and are sometimes lightweight for performance purposes.

Another variation of lug nut is the "locking wheel nut", which is used as a theft prevention method to keep thieves from stealing a vehicle's wheels. When utilizing locking wheel nuts, one standard lug nut on each wheel is replaced with a nut that requires a unique key (typically a computer-designed, rounded star shape) to fit and remove the nut. This ensures that at least one lug nut will remain attached and, in theory, should prevent theft. However, universal removal tools are available which grip the head of the locking nut using a hardened left-hand thread. The success of locking wheel nuts depends on the determination of the would-be thief and the tools that they have available to them.

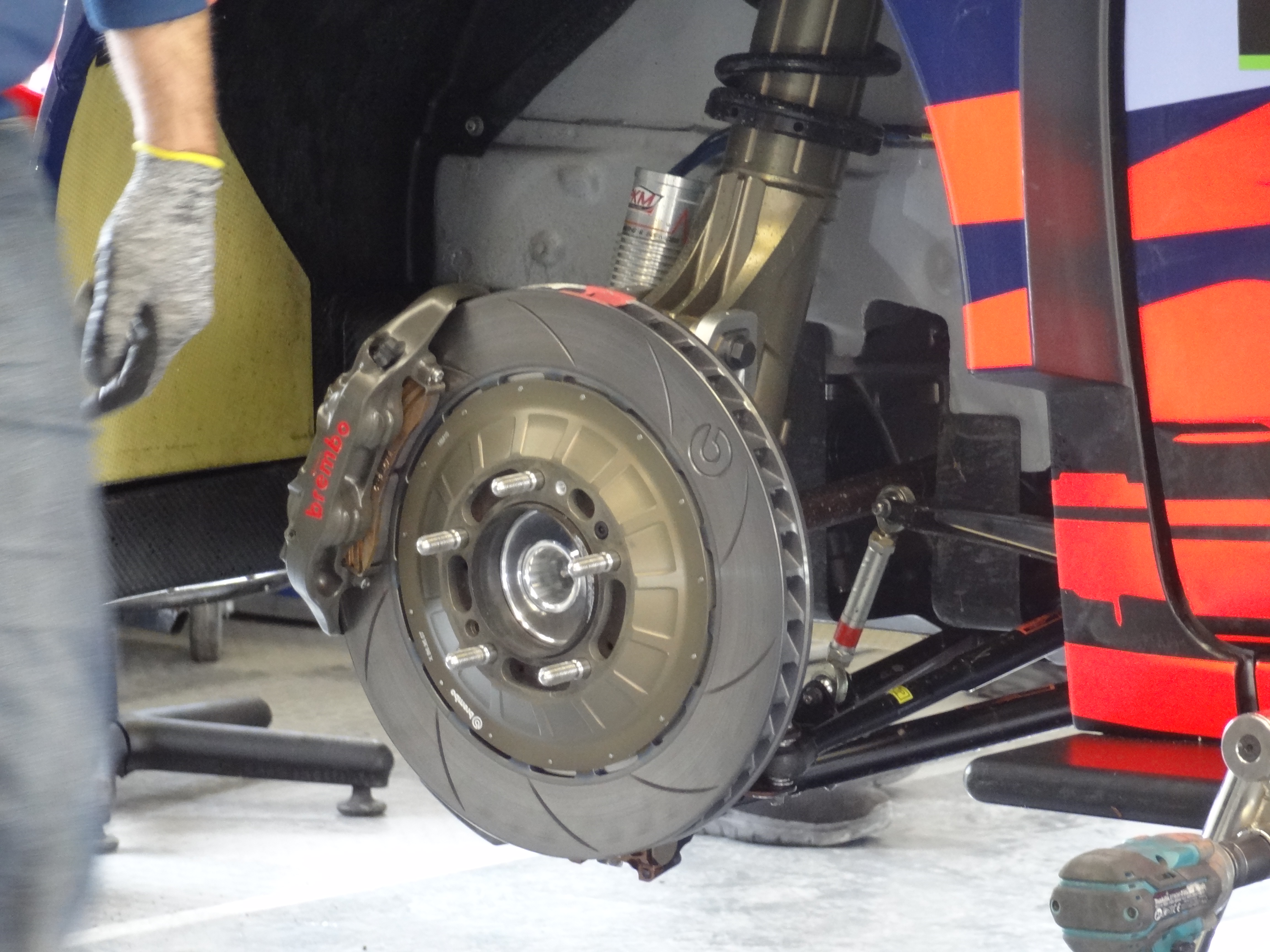
Car with five wheel studs for use with lug nuts

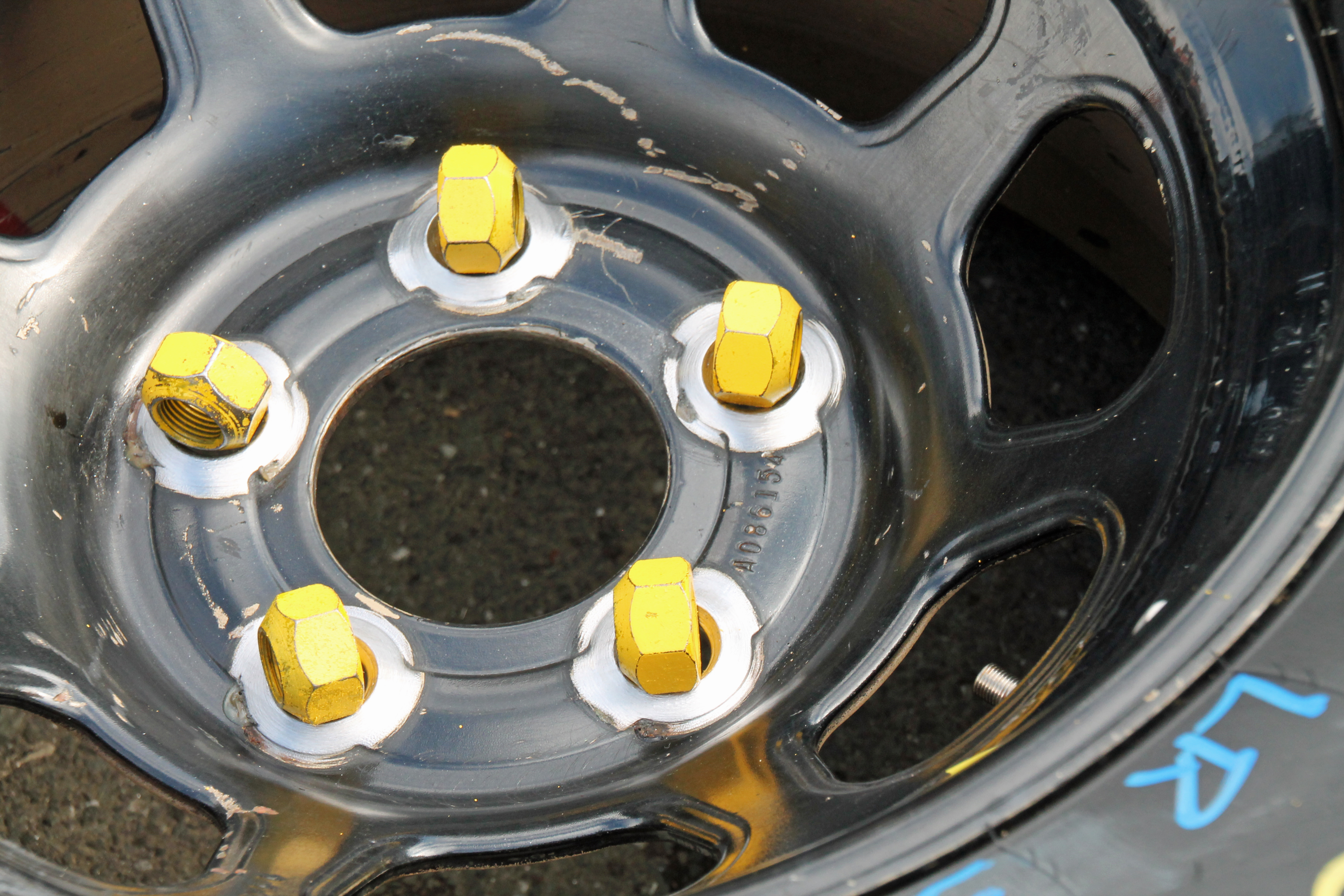
Five yellow lug nuts for use on a car with wheels studs

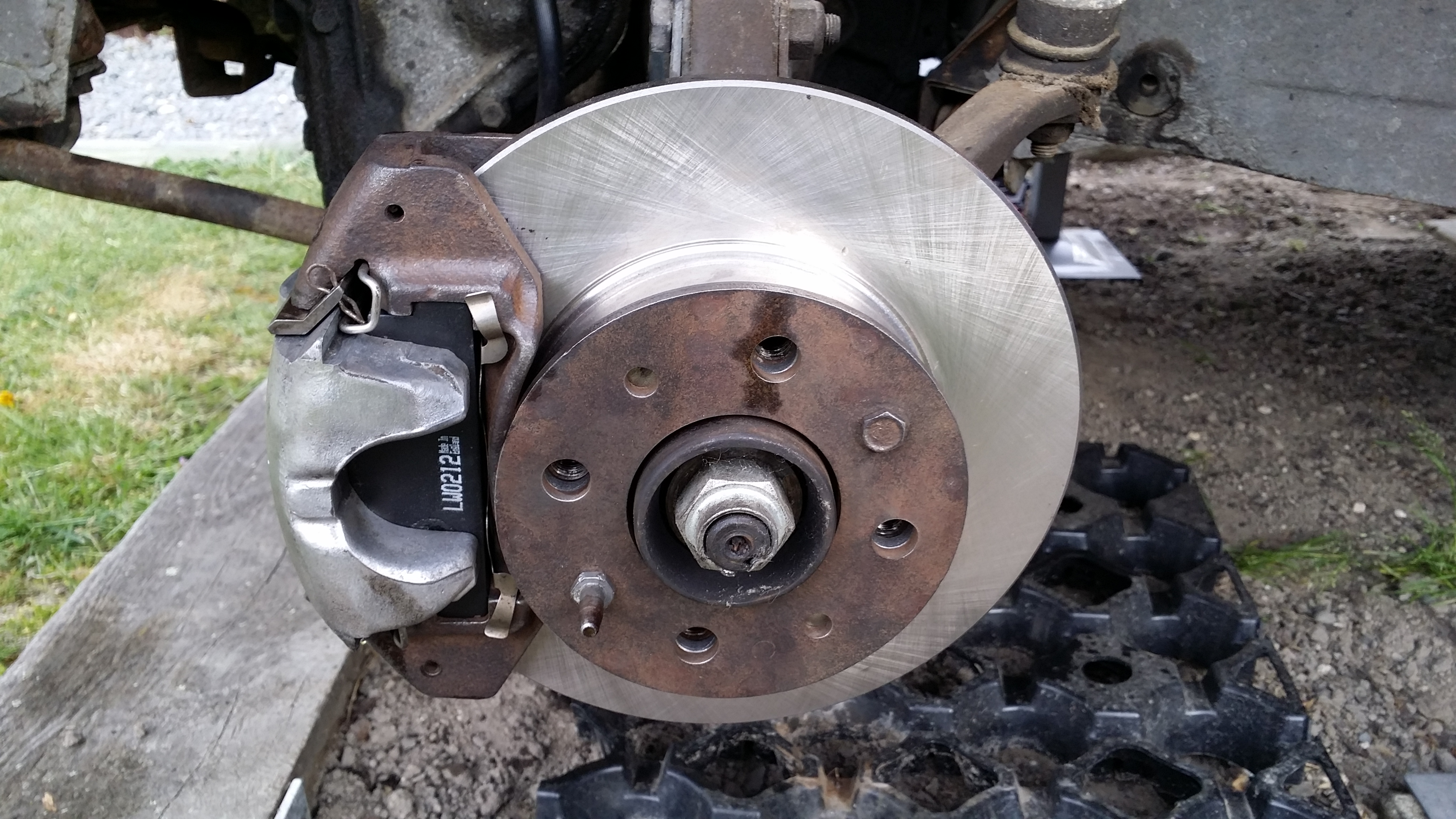
Car without wheels studs for use with (four) lug bolts

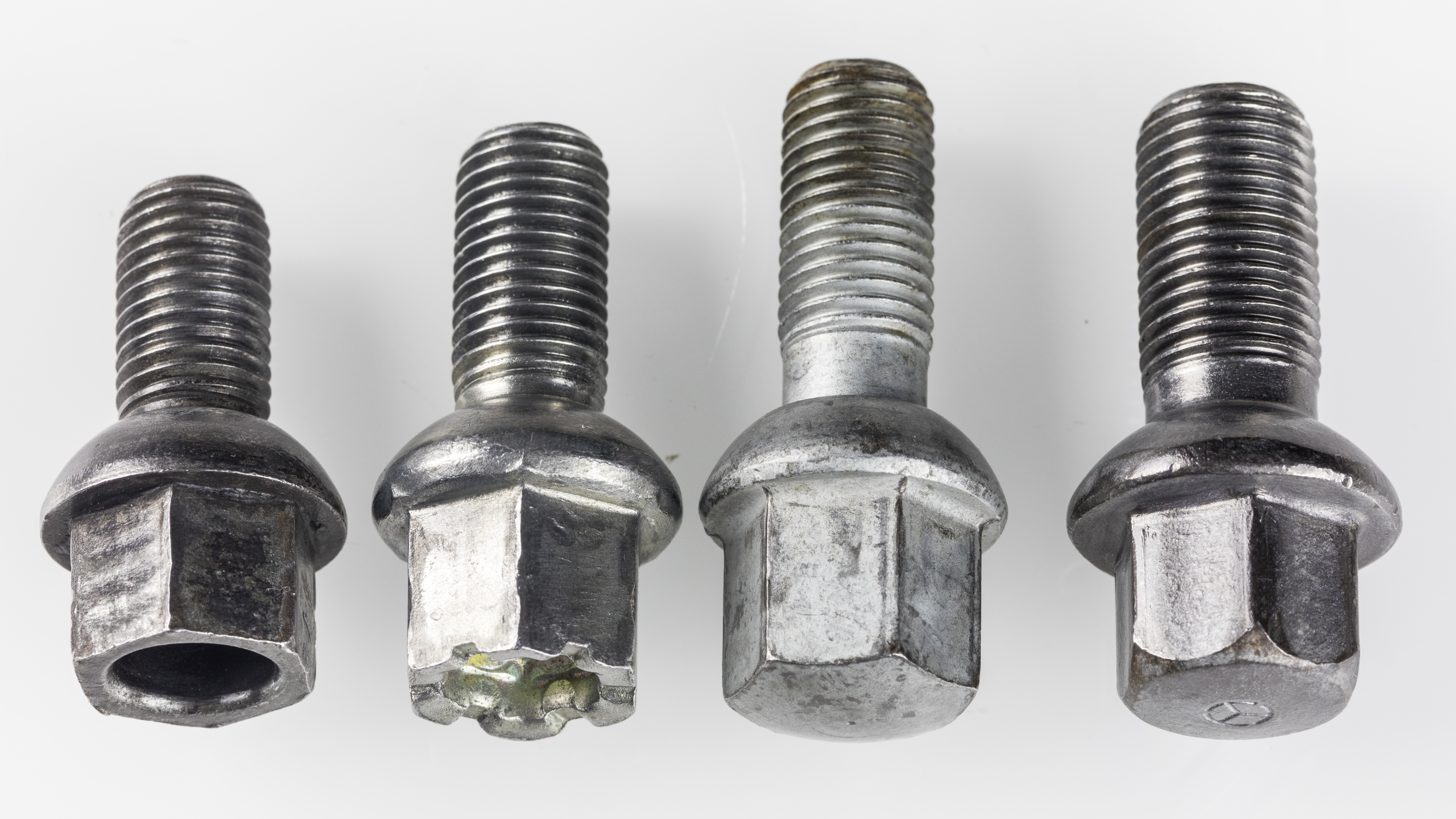
Four lug bolts, from left: Three M12x1.5 mm bolts with different length and one M14x1.5 mm bolt

=== Offset ===
Offset (marked in yellow).

The offset is the distance from the hub-mounting surface to the wheel's true centerline. It is quantified by an ET value (from the German Einpresstiefe, literally press-in depth) and measured in mm. A positive offset means the hub-mounting surface is closer to the outside edge of the wheel, while a negative offset means the hub-mounting surface is closer to the inside edge of the wheel.

A wheel with too much negative offset will be closer to the edge of the fender. This can cause clearance issues between the tire and the fender. One that has too much positive offset will be closer to the suspension components and could cause the tire to rub on them. Wheel width, offset, and its accompanying tire size all determine how a particular wheel/tire combination will fit on a given vehicle. Offset also affects the scrub radius of the steering and it is advisable to stay within the limits allowed by the vehicle manufacturer. Because wheel offset changes the lever-arm length between the center of the tire and the centerline of the steering knuckle, the way bumps, road imperfections, and acceleration/braking forces turn into steering torques (bump-steer, torque-steer, etc.) and thus, will change the drivability of the vehicle depending on wheel offset. Likewise, the wheel bearings will see increased thrust loads if the wheel centerline is moved away from the bearing centerline.

When choosing an offset for an aftermarket wheel, it is important to take note of the space between the outer edge of the wheel and the fender. Depending on the desired style, you may want to match the change in offset from stock wheels to the amount of space between the wheel face and the fender. For example, if there is 15 mm of space between the outer face of the wheel and the fender and you're wanting a flush fitment, you would want to go from a +45 mm offset to a +30 mm offset. This will bring the mounting surface of the wheel further inward towards the vehicle from the true center point of the wheel thus poking the wheel out by an extra 15 mm.

=== Centerbore ===
The centerbore of a wheel is the hole in the center of the wheel that centers it over the mounting hub of the car. Some factory wheels have a centerbore that matches exactly with the hub to reduce vibration by keeping the wheel centered. Wheels with the correct centerbore for the car they will be mounted on are known as hubcentric. Hubcentric wheels reduce the job of the lug nuts to center the wheel on the hub. Wheels that are not hubcentric are known as lugcentric, as the job of centering is done by the lug nuts assuming they are properly torqued down. Another, more common, term is hub piloted or stud piloted wheels and hubs. The stud piloted (lug centeric) is an older design while the hub piloted design is more commonly in use today and can provide for a more accurate connection.

Centerbore on aftermarket wheels must be equal to or greater than that of the hub, otherwise the wheel cannot be mounted on the car. Many aftermarket wheels come with "hubcentric rings" that lock or slide into the back of the wheel to adapt a wheel with a larger centerbore to a smaller hub. These adapters are usually made of plastic but also in aluminum. Plastic rings only provide initial centering, but are not strong enough to help support the wheel in case of high-speed pot hole hit. Steel ring is strongest, and aluminum is medium

=== Brake caliper clearance ===
The caliper clearance, also called the "X-factor", is the amount of clearance built into the wheel to clear the vehicle’s caliper assembly.

== Tire sizes ==
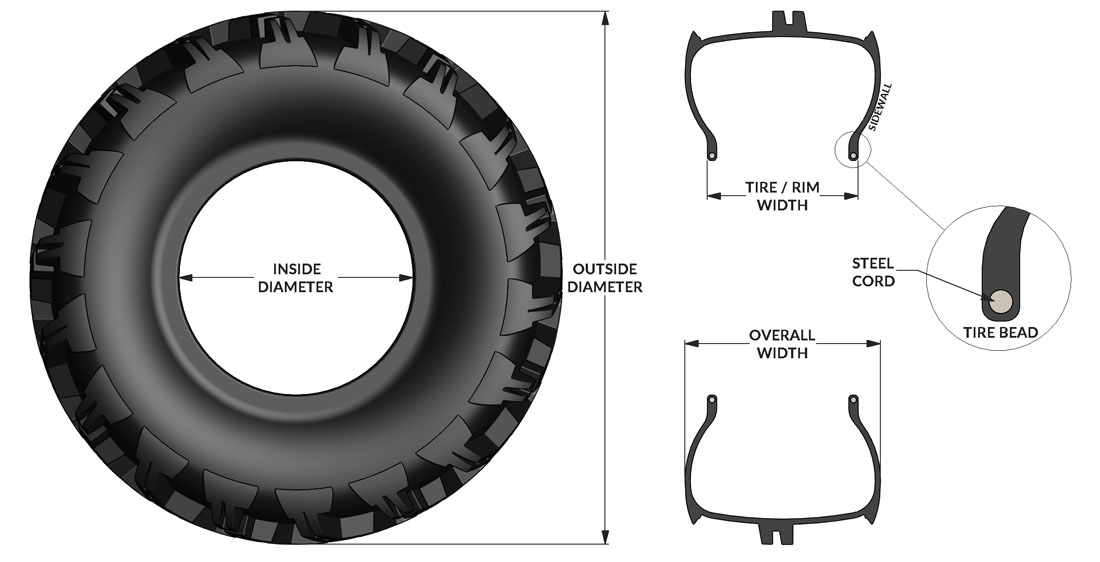
Example of tire sizing on an all-terrain vehicle.

Modern road tires have several measurements associated with their size as specified by tire codes like 225/70R14. The first number in the code (e.g., "225") represents the nominal tire width in millimeters. This is followed by the aspect ratio (e.g.,"70"), which is the height of the sidewall expressed as a percentage of the nominal tire width. "R" stands for radial and relates to the tire construction. The final number in the code (e.g.,"14") is the mating wheel diameter measured in inches. The overall circumference of the tire will increase by increasing any of the tire's specifications. For example, increasing the width of the tire will also increase its circumference, because the sidewall height is a proportional dimension. Increasing the aspect ratio will increase the height of the tire and hence the circumference.

Off-roading tires may use a different measurement scheme: Tread width × Outside diameter, followed by wheel size (all in inches) – for example 31×10.50R15 (787 mm × 267 mm R380 in metric designation). The size of the wheel, however, is denoted as 8.5 in × 20.0 in (220 mm × 510 mm). This means that the width of the wheel is 8.5 in (220 mm) and the diameter is 20 in (510 mm).

=== Load capacity ===
Load capacity is the amount of mass a wheel will carry. This number will vary depending on the number of lugs, the PCD, the material used and the type of axle the wheel is used on. A wheel used on a free rolling trailer axle will carry more weight than that same wheel used on the drive or steering axle of a vehicle. All wheels will have the load capacity stamped on the back of the wheel. The Gross Vehicle Weight Rating (GVWR) is the maximum operating mass of a vehicle as specified by the manufacturer. In the United States this information is required to be on the vehicle's door placard. The load capacity of the total number of wheels on the vehicle combined must meet or exceed the vehicle's gross vehicle weight rating.

== Staggered wheel fitment ==
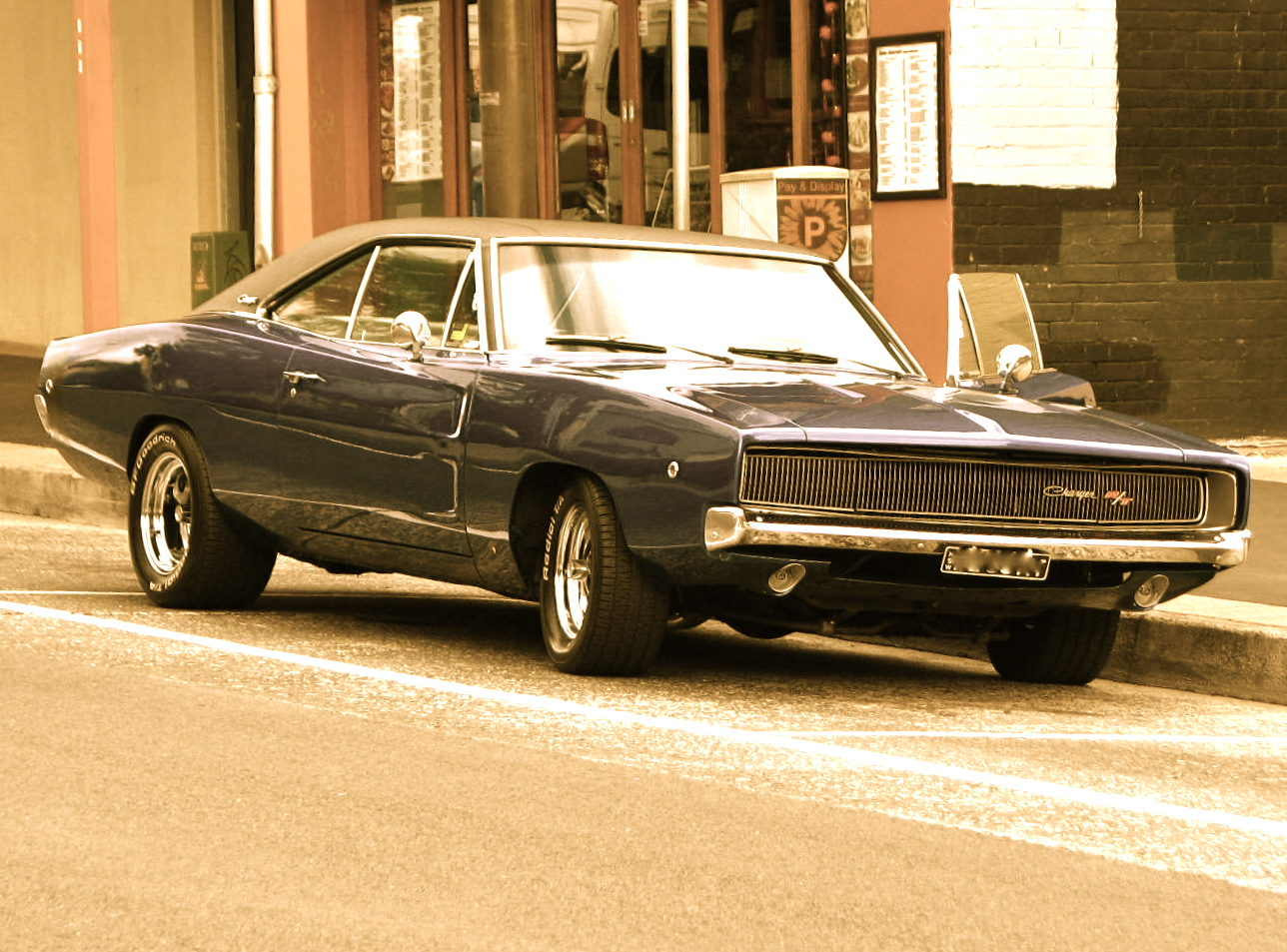
Wide rear wheel on a 1968 Dodge Charger, an example of a staggered wheel fitment.

Staggered wheel fitment usually appears on rear-wheel-drive vehicles (and in smaller numbers some all-wheel-drive cars), when the rear wheels are wider than the front wheels. Such a wheel setup may be found on the Ford Mustang, Infiniti G35, certain models of Mercedes-Benz and BMW, etc. A good example of such wheel combination is having 19 in × 8 in (480 mm × 200 mm) in front and 19 in × 9.5 in (480 mm × 240 mm) in the rear. Technically, wider wheels in the rear allow better grip with the road surface which is a performance benefit for better acceleration.

Advantages

- Better grip with the road for improved acceleration;
- Better cornering ability;

Disadvantages

- The rear wheels cannot be rotated to the front and vice versa;
- The front and rear wheels will have different tire sizes;
- In case of improper installation the large rear wheel may rub suspension or wheel arches.

Another setup option of staggered wheel fitment is called double staggered, having smaller diameter narrow width wheels in the front with larger diameter and wider width wheel in the back. For example, a vehicle may feature 18 in × 8 in (460 mm × 200 mm) wheels in front and 19 in × 10 in (480 mm × 250 mm) in the rear. Such setups are found in the Chevrolet Corvettes, the first and second generation of the Acura NSX, and some others.

== See also ==
- Plus sizing
- Speedometer#Error - handy tire diameter formula, using tire code
- Tire code
- Uniform Tire Quality Grading (UTQG)
- Determine Wheel Size
