= Salazar Racing =

Salazar Racing is a Washington, D.C.–based auto racing team currently competing in the One Lap of America, Sports Car Club of America (SCCA) Autocross, and National Auto Sport Association (NASA) GTS and Spec E30 racing series.

== History ==
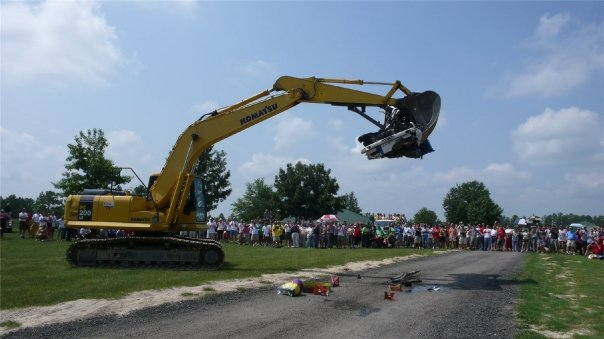
Car being destroyed at CMP, July '08

Salazar Racing was formed in 2001 by a group of autocrossers competing in the Philadelphia SCCA Winter Autocross Series. After incorporating in 2002, Salazar Racing began hosting its own autocrosses and competing in the Washington, D.C. region. In 2003, the team entered in the One Lap of America with a BMW E30 325 that would eventually go on to race in the inaugural season of the Spec E30 race series.

Its members have been featured in BMWCCA Roundel, Car and Driver and MTV's Fast Enuff reality show.

In 2008, the team achieved fame by being selected as the People's Curse victim in 24 Hours of LeMons and appearing on MotorWeek.
