= Towson United Methodist Church =

Coordinates: 39.41437°N 76.59886°W

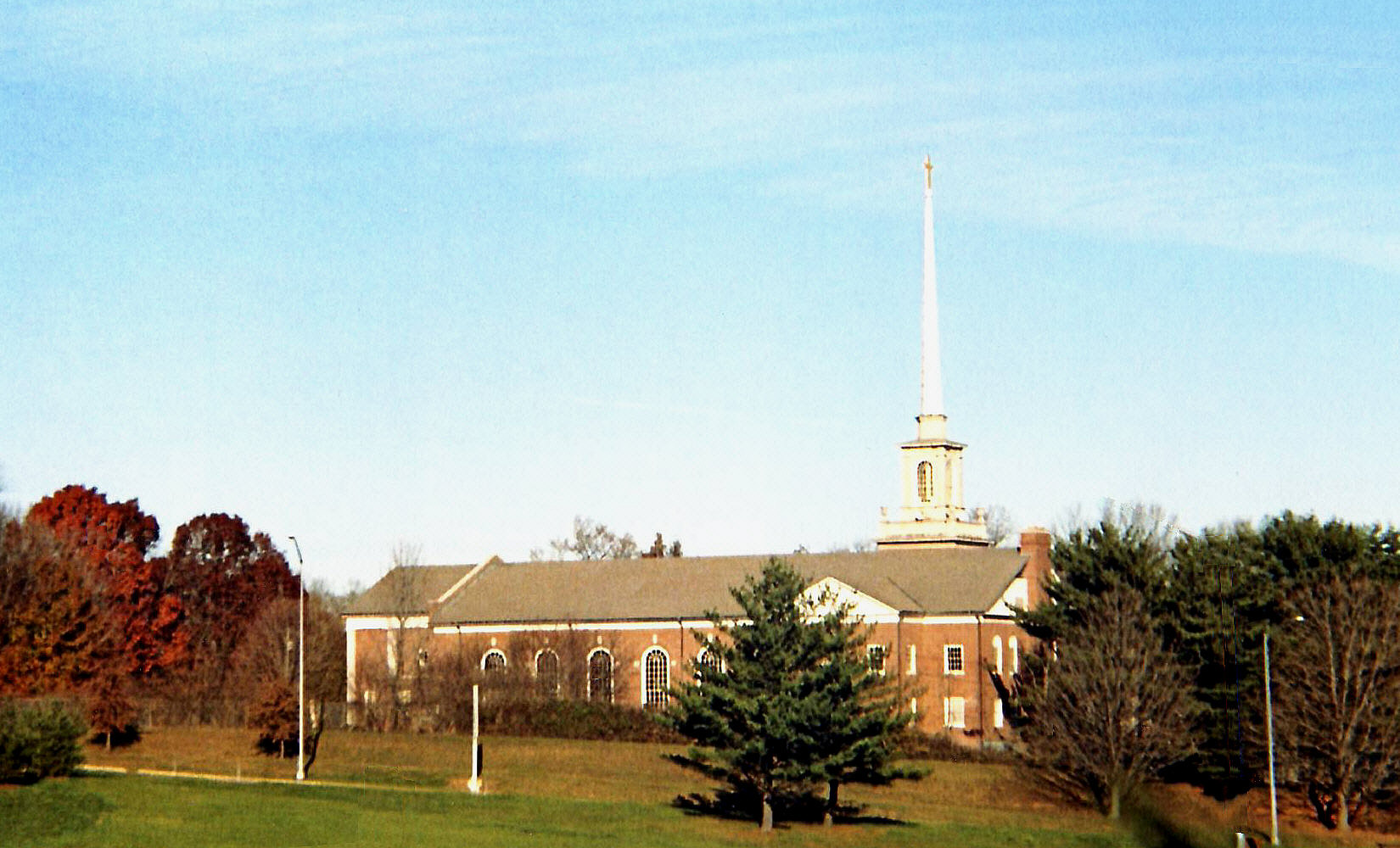
- The west exterior and 235-foot (72 m) spire, viewed from I-695
- Towson United Methodist Church
- Location: Towson, Maryland
- Country: United States
- Denomination: United Methodist Church
- Website: towsonchurch.org

History
- Former name(s): Towson Methodist Episcopal Church (later First Methodist Church); Towson Methodist Protestant Church (later Second Methodist Church)
- Founded: October 26, 1871

Architecture
- Architect: J. Alfred Hamme
- Style: Georgian
- Groundbreaking: October 7, 1956
- Completed: May 11, 1958

Administration
- Division: Baltimore-Washington Conference

Towson United Methodist Church is a large United Methodist Church in the historic Hampton subdivision of Towson, a suburb in Baltimore County, Maryland. Its past, rooted in 19th-century America and subsequent growth in the two centuries since then, has closely paralleled the nation's political and sociological trends. It was a congregation split in 1861 on the eve of the American Civil War in a border state of divided loyalties, which eventually reunited and built a church in the post–World War II era of the 1950s, a time of reconciliation and rapid growth by mainline Protestant denominations, especially in the more affluent suburbs.

Pastored since July 2021 by Stephanie Roberts White, the church now brands itself as Towson Church with a blended traditional–contemporary Sunday worship service, along with a number of community outreach programs, including an accredited child care center and a Boy Scout troop. The church actively supports a home for unwed mothers, overseas missions, and Habitat for Humanity projects. The congregation worships in a 1,000-seat sanctuary built in 1958. The large building's prominent 235-foot (72 m) spire and cupola, a landmark visible for miles from the nearby Baltimore Beltway (Interstate 695), has been called "the beacon of Towson".

Towson United Methodist Church is located on Hampton Lane at interchange #27B of the Baltimore Beltway and Dulaney Valley Road (Md. Route 146), one-half mile (one km) west of Hampton National Historic Site. The church's land was originally part of the vast 18th-century Hampton estate.

== History ==
=== The beginning; 1750s–1850s ===
First settled by brothers William and Thomas Towson in 1752, the hamlet now bearing their name remained mostly farmland until the 1830s, with no churches and little more than a roadside inn/tavern for travelers on York Road (now Md. Route 45). In the 1790s, Rebecca Dorsey Ridgely, the wife of Charles Ridgely III and described as an ardent Methodist, began holding prayer meetings at the Ridgelys' grandiose Hampton Mansion, located one-half mi (one km) east of the present church site. By 1825, the first Sunday School was started in a private home near a blacksmith's shop on York Road. In 1839, the citizenry of sparsely populated Towsontown, as the village was called by then, built the tiny community's first church in a wooded location north of Joppa Road and east of Dulaney Valley Road. The site was previously used for a powder magazine built by Gen. Nathan Towson prior to the British attack on Baltimore in September 1814, during the War of 1812. Called Epsom Chapel, the 1,000-square-foot (93 m^{2}) structure was built of stones salvaged from the arsenal. Led by Methodist Episcopal minister Daniel Helpler, Epsom Chapel was dedicated and opened for Towsontown's first public church service on Sunday, November 10, 1839. In line with Methodist practice of the time in rural areas, circuit rider ministers would travel on horseback to preach to the villagers at Epsom Chapel. With the designation of Towson as the county seat in 1854, the town began to grow more rapidly. The small chapel was shared with other denominations until the 1870s, when Towson's increasing population spurred the construction of larger churches.

=== Division and separate churches; 1860s–1950s ===
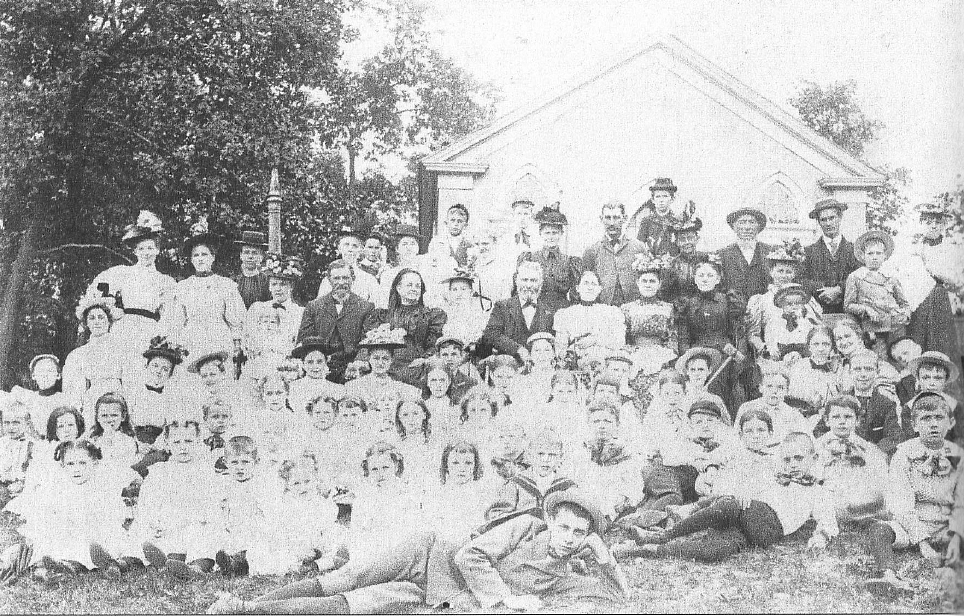
The congregation at Epsom Chapel in 1899

The Methodist movement was growing rapidly in pre-Civil War America, but was beset by disputes about slave-holding and the rule over the church by bishops, resulting in a formal split into two groups in 1844. The faction in favor of giving church authority to a hierarchy of bishops called themselves the Methodist Episcopal Church and took an anti-slavery stance in the north. Those in opposition formed the Methodist Protestant Church in the United States. As the impending Civil War loomed over the nation in the 1850s, local Towson Methodists continued to worship together at Epsom Chapel.

This ended in 1861, when a reed organ was purchased for Epsom Chapel, sparking a disagreement over the use of musical instruments in worship. A minority opposed to the idea joined the southern-leaning Methodist Protestant Church, withdrawing from Epsom Chapel to worship at Towson's Odd Fellows Hall during the Civil War. In 1867, the Methodist Protestants returned to Epsom Chapel, but met separately on Sunday afternoons.

==== Towson Methodist Episcopal Church (First Methodist Church) ====
The northern-leaning Methodist Episcopal congregation, which continued worshiping at Epsom Chapel during the Civil War, began building their own church nearby, with the laying of a cornerstone on August 14, 1869. The Towson Methodist Episcopal (ME) Church, a neo-Gothic brick structure, was located on York Road next to the present Prospect Hill Cemetery, one block north of the intersection with Joppa and Dulaney Valley Roads. Designed by Edmund George Lind and built at a cost of $29,000, the 350-seat church was completed and dedicated on October 26, 1871.

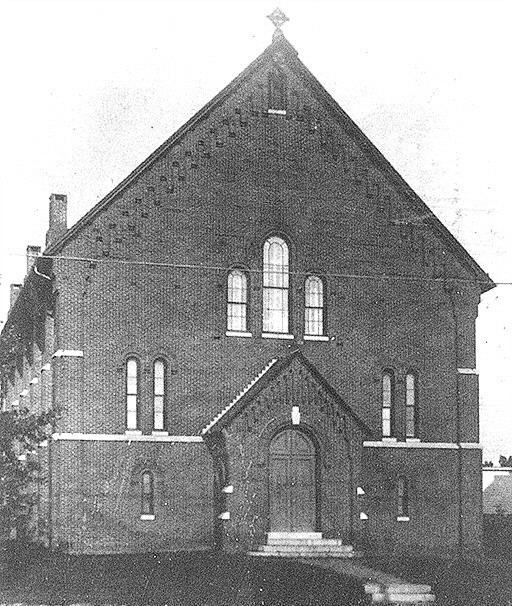
Towson Methodist Episcopal Church, built in 1871

The ME Church's eighty-seven members soon found themselves in financial difficulties, however, having gone heavily in debt to build their new sanctuary. The chairman of the church's building committee had advanced his personal funds to complete the construction, thereafter becoming embroiled in years of litigation with the church. By 1874, the church was drawing larger crowds under then-pastor Joseph Stitt, who was described as an "excellent leader of singing". An afternoon Sunday school session was particularly popular, "principally devoted to learning new hymns, which attracted many of the young people of the town, especially the young men", noted one account. When the ME church held its twenty-fifth anniversary celebration in 1896, it opened with prayer and a piano concert, "favored with a beautiful selection sung by Mrs. Randolph Murphy", said a contemporary report.

Although the two Methodist congregations had remained estranged since the split in 1861, both groups did come together in 1895 for a "Great Revival" in Towson. The joint services were attended by throngs and the "preaching was with power", newspapers commented. At the beginning of the 20th century, the increasingly large and prosperous congregation added eleven stained glass windows to the ME church, including Christ the Good Shepherd by Heinrich Hofmann. In 1921, a new pipe organ was installed by M. P. Möller.

==== Towson Methodist Protestant Church (Second Methodist Church) ====
Towson Methodist Protestant Church in the 1920s

The Methodist Protestant group continued to use Epsom Chapel until 1908, when they built a $6,000 church seating 150 persons at the corner of Allegheny and Bosley Avenues. Located in the heart of Towson near the County Circuit Courthouse, the Towson Methodist Protestant Church was constructed of stone with a slate roof and a bell tower.

With the merger in 1939 of the Methodist Episcopal (ME) and Methodist Protestant (MP) denominations in the US, Towson's Methodist Episcopal and Methodist Protestant churches were known thereafter as First Methodist Church and Second Methodist Church, respectively.

=== The reunited church; 1950s–present ===
Following the reunification of the two branches of Methodism in 1939, First Methodist Church and Second Methodist Church of Towson continued as separate entities for another thirteen years. After the end of World War II in 1945, mainline Protestant church attendance increased significantly in the US. By early 1952, faced with facilities fast becoming inadequate for the burgeoning population of suburbia in the postwar period and with a boom in modern commercial development of Towson's core area starting to displace older buildings, the two churches formed a joint committee to evaluate a merger. The committee recommended that the two churches become one, concluding:

The properties of the First and Second Churches are located in close proximity to each other ... the identical objectives, program and methods of work of the two churches, will continue to make competition and overlapping inevitable ... by pooling their resources and unifying ... they can better serve the community and the Kingdom of God.

In April 1952, more than ninety years after the two churches split, the congregations of both finally voted to reunite, merging on June 1, 1952, and adopting the name Towson Methodist Church. The members of both Methodist churches then began worshiping together at the First Methodist Church. Plans to construct a much larger building with ample parking were announced when the two churches merged and 16 acres (65,000 m^{2}) of undeveloped land, originally part of the Ridgelys' Hampton estate and north of the planned alignment of the Baltimore Beltway (I-695), were purchased soon thereafter from Goucher College.

Groundbreaking for the new church, October 7, 1956

A groundbreaking ceremony was held on October 7, 1956, and construction of the new church was completed by the John K. Ruff Company in May 1958, with a service of dedication held on May 11, 1958. A crowd of 1,250 attended the ceremonies in the new sanctuary, with an overflow of 550 persons watching by closed-circuit television in the lower level Fellowship Hall.

The old First ME Church structure adjacent to Prospect Hill Park Cemetery on McCurdy Avenue (now Investment Place) and York Road was abandoned and eventually demolished in 1965. An illuminated display of the stained glass windows of the former church is located in the foyer of the current building. The Second ME Church structure was sold in 1954 to the Women's Club of Towson and still stands today—in 2005, the building was resold to an office development firm and is now used by an insurance agency. The erstwhile Epsom Chapel eventually became a meeting hall for boy scout troops in the 1920s–1930s. It was subsequently abandoned and finally demolished in 1952 to make way for construction of a parking lot for the old Hutzler's department store, near the present Macy's department store and Towson Town Center mall. No trace of Epsom Chapel exists today, except for an historical marker placed near the site by the Baltimore County Historical Society, designating it as the "cradle of Methodism in Towson".

The current name, Towson United Methodist Church, was adopted in 1968 to reflect the merger in that year of the Methodist and Evangelical United Brethren denominations in the US. On Pentecost Sunday, May 11, 2008, the fiftieth anniversary of the present sanctuary's completion was celebrated by a reenactment of the original May 11, 1958, dedication service.

== Current building and facilities ==
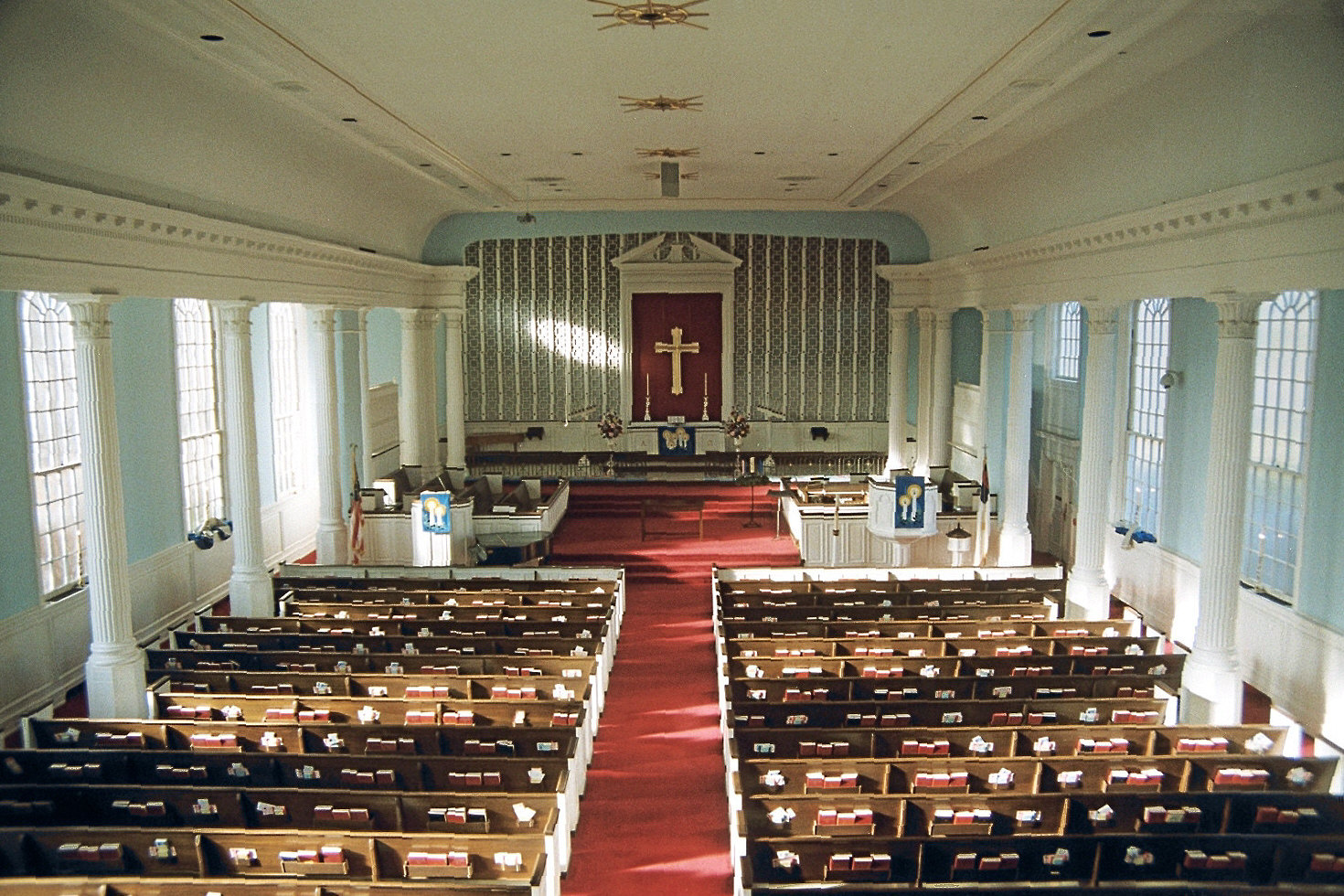
Sanctuary interior viewed from the balcony, the organ pipework and windchests are concealed behind the altar screen

Towson United Methodist Church is an L-shaped structure, with the main sanctuary on a north–south axis. Designed by architect J. Alfred Hamme and completed in 1958, the church is built of red brick in the Georgian architectural style, with a prominent, floodlighted spire surmounted by a 9-foot (3 m) porcelain enamel gold cross visible at 3–5 mi (5–8 km) distance on the Beltway. The imposing front facade is of cut stone from Pennsylvania, with the 18-foot (5 m) high main entranceway capped by a curved stone pediment. Inside, the sanctuary has three aisles with a rear balcony and can accommodate up to one thousand persons. Rows of Corinthian columns standing on 4-foot (122 cm) bases flank the pews along both side aisles. The pulpit and doors are made of mahogany.

The 3-story east–west wing has classrooms, offices, a chapel, and the John D. Hoffman library featuring an exhibit of memorabilia and historical artifacts along with archival records. Construction of the church cost $950,000 in 1958 (equivalent to almost $9 million in 2021), not including the expense of land acquisition.

=== Organ and carillon ===
Towson United Methodist Church has a 3-manual, 48-rank Casavant pipe organ of 2,790 pipes, including seven ranks of 16 ft. pipes and tubular chimes. It was dedicated in memory of S. Clayton Seitz by then-organist John Duwane Hoffman on May 11, 1958. Hoffman, the church's esteemed virtuoso organist and minister of music between 1957 and 1988, was a graduate of Union Theological Seminary's renowned Master of Sacred Music degree program, after having earned Bachelor of Music and Master of Music degrees at the University of Denver. He also did post-graduate work at Catholic University of America. At Union, Hoffman studied the organ with Clarence Dickinson and Vernon De Tar. In addition to serving as the church's organist and choral director, Hoffman was professor of organ at Towson State University. He died unexpectedly on July 4, 1988, of a ruptured aorta while hospitalized following heart bypass surgery. The church library is named in his memory. Hoffman was succeeded by Kathie Metz, a graduate of Marshall University, as Director of Music and Organist 1988–2012. The current Director of Music and Organist since July, 2013, is Douglas Hollida, an ordained minister. According to the church, Hollida studied music at Shepherd University, graduating with a Bachelor of Arts degree, and then earned a Master of Divinity degree from Trinity Episcopal School for Ministry. World-famous concert organists who have performed at the church's organ include Pierre Cochereau, Flor Peeters, and Marilyn Mason.

A two-octave Schulmerich electronic carillon of twenty-five bells was installed in the tower in June 1958. It was played from the organ console by a carillonneur on Sunday mornings before and after services, as well as on special occasions, such as Christmas Eve and as part of the traditional noontime nationwide peal of church bells on the Fourth of July. Hymns were also played daily on the carillon by a music roll until it was discontinued in the 1990s.

=== Renovation and expansion ===
Towson United Methodist Church adopted a phased, multiyear master plan in 2005, envisioning $3 million in eventual improvements beginning in 2006. As part of the plan, an elevator and additional facilities were installed for improved disabled accessibility, along with a new fire sprinkler system and replacement of the building's climate control system (HVAC) in 2007.

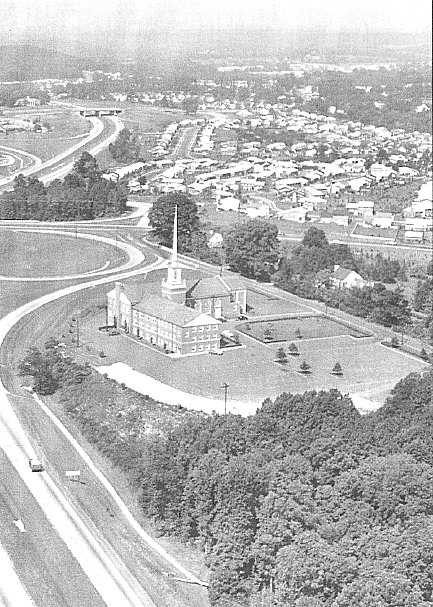
Foreground: the church's wooded property, part of which was proposed for development in 2008

To help fund the future works, the church announced plans in January 2008 to sell 5 acres (20,000 m^{2}) of undeveloped, wooded property it owns on Hampton Lane to Shelter Development Corp. for construction of a senior citizen housing complex. A zoning change application was submitted to Baltimore County officials to allow sixteen residential units per acre (current zoning limits density to two residential units per acre) for a total of 80–100 beds. The Hampton Improvement Association, representing neighboring Hampton, Maryland residents, said they " ...oppose[d] zoning changes that would allow higher density residential development and require trees to be knocked down". Then-pastor David Cooney told the Baltimore Sun, "We entered into this with Shelter, believing this is a good use for the land – that this is a good company and a needed service". In the face of community objections, however, Shelter and the church subsequently announced on March 3, 2008, that the development plans had been dropped. A Shelter official said that his company and Towson United Methodist Church had jointly come to the conclusion that "this is not something we are going to pursue". Cooney said, "It had become clear that we weren't going to be able to reach a compromise and we certainly don't want to be at war with our neighbors". In the wake of the plan's shelving, the president of the Hampton Improvement Association told the Towson Times that his group wishes to work with Towson United Methodist Church to find an alternative use for the land besides commercial development, as they "don't want to preclude the church from trying to get some money out of it." In April 2008, Cooney said that the church "did not set out to sell this land; the proposal came to us, and we have no other plans to sell or develop the land". In 2019, additional renovations were completed, including a remodeled foyer and improved lighting, additional restrooms on the main level, and updated floor coverings.

== Ministry ==
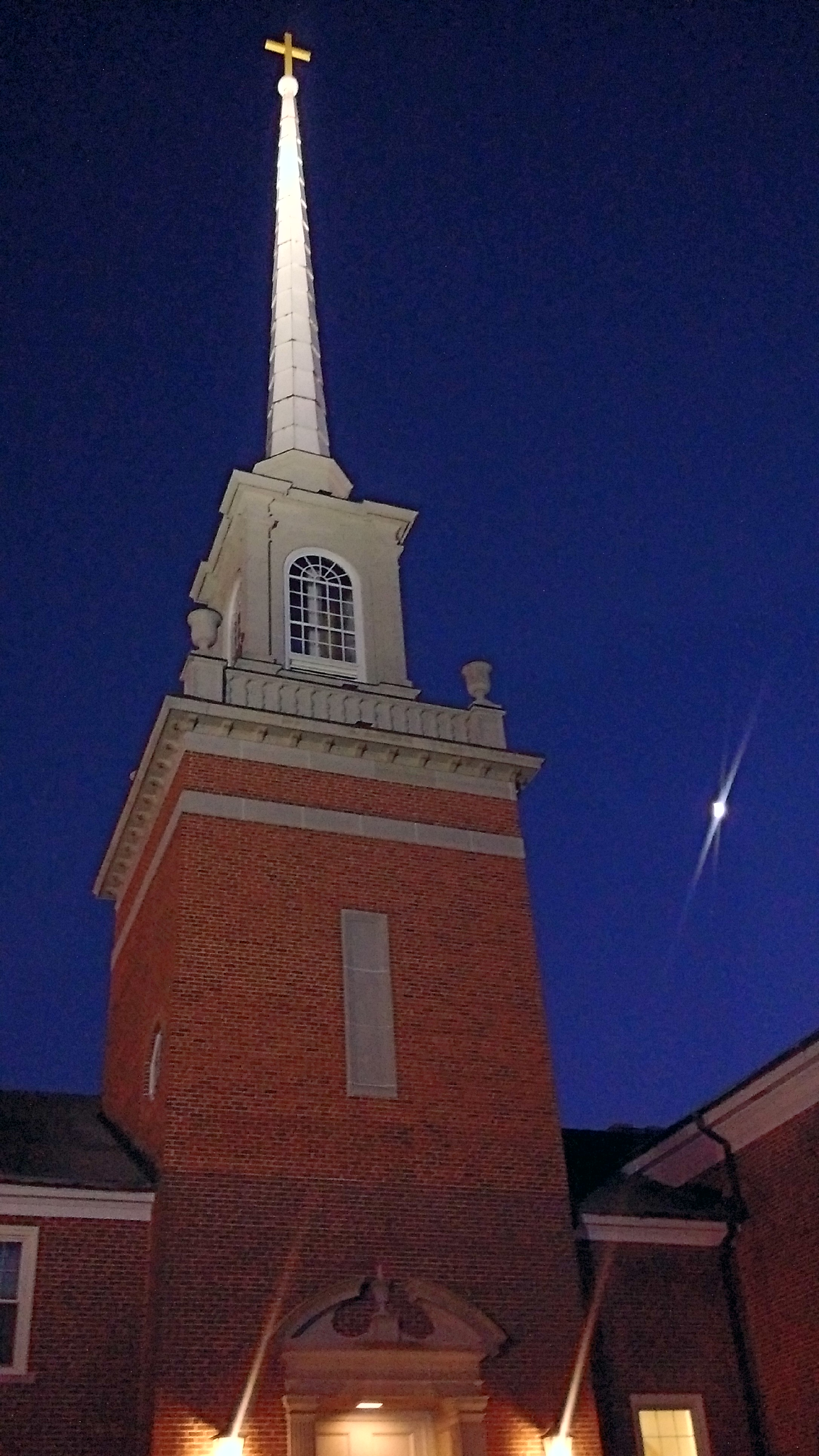
The church spire, illuminated at night

The mission statement of Towson United Methodist Church is: "To proclaim the Word of God and to make disciples of Jesus Christ". With the goal of enhancing its appeal to the greater Towson community, the church now brands itself as Towson Church with a blended traditional–contemporary Sunday worship service. The six-person staff includes assistant ministers, directors of music and education, and building and administrative personnel. It is a part of the United Methodist denomination's Baltimore-Washington Conference (district). In addition to the Sunday morning worship service, the congregation participates in graded Sunday school classes, various adult Bible study classes, youth activities, and various midweek activities. The music program includes both adult and youth choirs, as well as handbell ringers. As of 2015, the church had three handbell choirs with 22 ringers. Director of Music Doug Hollida said in a Baltimore Sun interview that the handbell choirs "give a broad, rich sound" to the services. In the 1960s–1980s, the church's "Alleluia Singers", an ensemble of high school-age young people, sang frequently for weekly worship services and toured the eastern US each summer.

=== Current Lead Pastor ===
Stephanie Roberts White became the church's first female Lead Pastor on July 1, 2021, succeeding Mark Johnson. White graduated from Texas Wesleyan University in 2003 with a Bachelor of Science (BS) degree in Christian Education. She earned a Master of Divinity (MDiv) degree in 2009 from Asbury Theological Seminary, Kentucky, receiving the Stranger Preaching Award, given to only one graduating senior each year. She was ordained in 2013. Before her appointment to the pulpit of Towson United Methodist Church, White was minister of Pleasant Hills UMC in Owings Mills. Her husband, Maj. Kevin White, is a U.S. Army chaplain at Fort Meade.

=== Previous ministers ===
==== Mark W. Johnson (2017–2021) ====
Mark W. Johnson was Lead Pastor of Towson United Methodist Church from July 1, 2017, to July 1, 2021, when he received a new appointment as pastor of Mission Valley United Methodist Church in Ronan, Montana. Johnson had succeeded Roderick J. Miller, who retired in June, 2017. Johnson was previously Senior Pastor of Mt. Olive United Methodist Church in Randallstown, Maryland, from August, 2009, to his appointment at Towson UMC. He was ordained to the ministry by the United Methodist Church in 1995, following studies at the Iliff School of Theology in Denver, Colorado, where he earned Master of Divinity and Doctor of Ministry degrees. He and his wife Sandi (also an ordained minister in the United Methodist Church), have led mission teams to various nations, including Russia, Kenya, and Honduras.

==== Roderick J. Miller (2011–2017) ====
Roderick J. Miller was Lead Pastor of Towson United Methodist Church between July 1, 2011, and June 30, 2017. Miller grew up in Pennsylvania, where he graduated from Allegheny College in 1976, receiving a Bachelor of Arts degree in religion. He then studied at Wesley Theological Seminary in Washington, DC, earning a Master of Divinity degree in 1982. While ministering at Union Chapel United Methodist Church in Joppa, Maryland, Miller continued his postgraduate studies, receiving a Doctor of Ministry degree in Church Revitalization from Chicago's McCormick Theological Seminary in 1992. He was later Lead Pastor at Bethany UMC church in Ellicott City, Maryland (1994–2005), after which he was named Director of Connectional Ministries for the denomination's Baltimore-Washington Conference, serving in that role 2005–2011.

==== David Cooney (2001–2011) ====
David Cooney was Senior Pastor of Towson United Methodist Church between September 1, 2001, and June 30, 2011. He earned a Master of Divinity degree from Wesley Theological Seminary and a PhD from Iliff School of Theology in Denver. Prior to his appointment at Towson United Methodist Church, Cooney was senior minister at Eppworth United Methodist Church in Cockeysville, Maryland. His father, C. Douglas Cooney (1928–2003), was a Methodist minister at various churches, including the First Methodist Church of Hyattsville, Maryland, as well as a Methodist denomination official.

==== Stephen C. Rettenmayer (1995-2001) ====
Stephen Rettenmeyer was a talented musician before entering the ministry. As a high school student in Illinois, he was all-state clarinetist. He then played clarinet and saxophone in the elite United States Marine Band, "The President's Own", including appearances at the White House and playing for the funeral of President John F. Kennedy. After sensing a call to the ministry, Rettenmeyer earned a Doctor of Ministry degree in 1973 at Union Theological Seminary in Richmond, Virginia. He pastored Towson Methodist from 1995 to 2001, when he went to England to preach at the American Church in London and appear as a frequent BBC commentator. Rettenmeyer died on June 28, 2015.

==== Walter C. Smith, Jr. (1976-1995) ====
Long-time senior pastor Walter Smith earned a Doctor of Ministry degree from Princeton Theological Seminary. During his nineteen years at Towson Methodist, a new chapel and expanded classrooms were added. He started the church's daycare center. Smith died on June 19, 2003, at age 73.

==== John Bayley Jones IV (1965-1976) ====
John Bayley Jones IV earned a master's degree at McDaniel College, where he later taught and received an honorary Doctor of Divinity degree. He was a strong proponent of racial integration during the turbulent civil rights struggles of the 1960s. He died at age 95 on June 10, 2003, just nine days before his successor, Walter Smith, also died.

==== Lewis F. Ransom (1951-1965) ====
Lewis F. Ransom was senior minister of Towson's First Methodist Church at the time of the two churches' merger in 1952 and subsequently first minister of the unified Towson Methodist Church during its construction and first decade. He was later shot and killed during a robbery on March 22, 1988, as the 76-year-old clergyman returned to his car after making a nighttime pastoral visit to patients at a downtown Baltimore hospital.

==== First Methodist Church ministers (1871–1951) ====
Former senior ministers of Towson Methodist Church's predecessor First Methodist Church, with their years of appointment, are:

- John W. Cornelius (1871-1872)
- Joseph R. Stitt (1872-1874)
- C. Herbert Richardson (1874-1877)
- N. F. B. Rice (1877-1880)
- James N. Davis (1880-1882)
- W. T. D. Clem (1882-1885)
- Watson Case (1885-1887)
- Page Milburn (1887-1891)
- Randolph R. Murphy (1891-1892)
- Asbury R. Riley (1892-1897)
- Edward C. Gallager (1897-1900)
- John R. Edwards (1900-1905)

- Thomas E. Copes (1905-1910)
- John L. Walsh (1910-1914)
- Samuel M. Alford (1914-1917)
- Richard G. Koontz (1917-1923)
- Mark Depp (1923-1927)
- Walter F. Atkinson (1927-1929)
- Edgar Cordell Powers (1929-1932)
- William A. Keese (1932-1935)
- Clifford H. Richmond (1936-1941)
- Asbury Smith (1941-1947)
- G. Custer Cromwell (1947-1951)

=== Community outreach ===
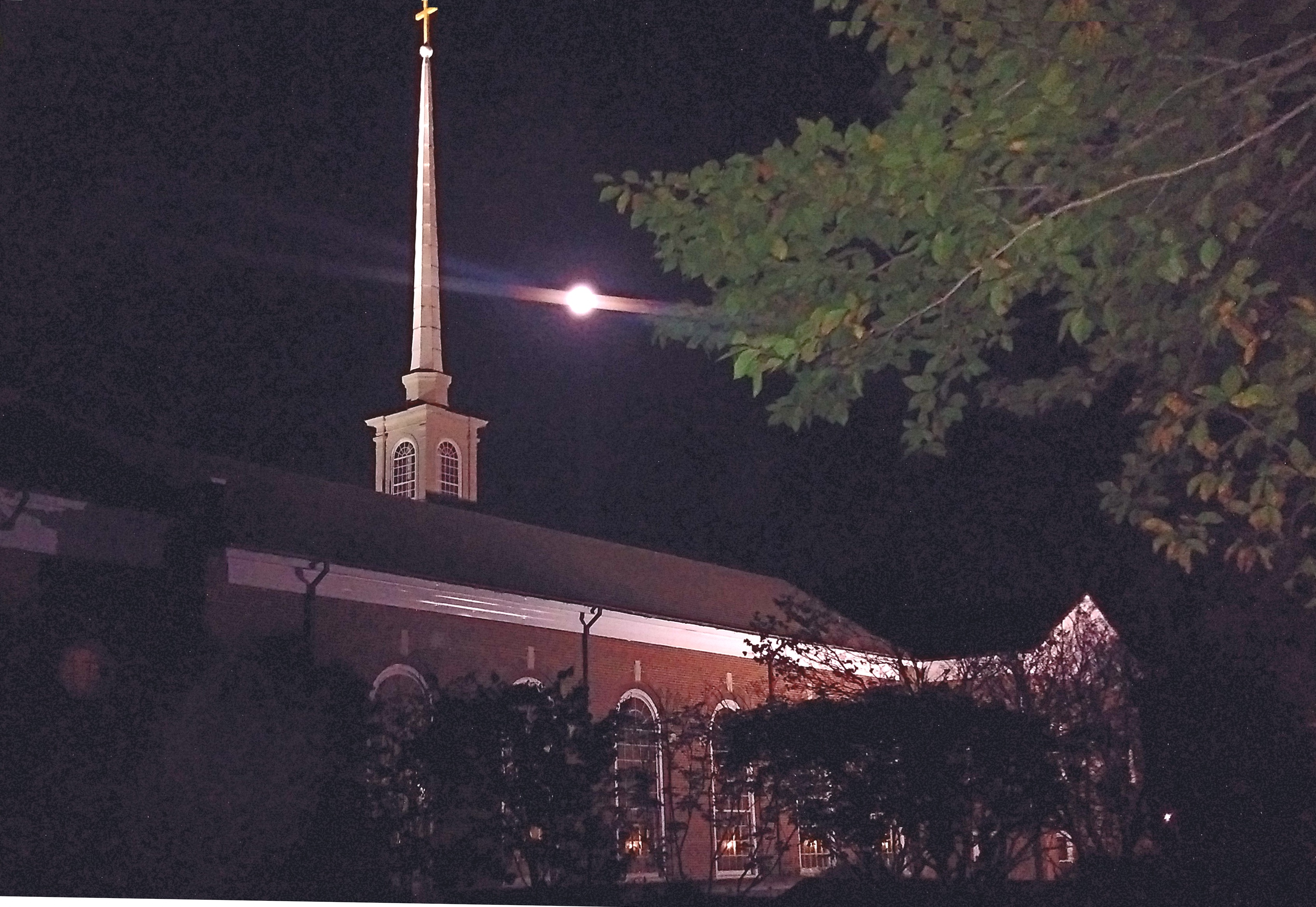
The church at night (2017)

Towson United Methodist Church sponsors overseas missions, the Susanna Wesley House for unwed mothers, and actively participates in Habitat for Humanity projects. Over the years, members of the Towson Methodist Men's group and Women's Society of Christian Service (now United Methodist Women) have supported Meals on Wheels, the League of Women Voters, and Head Start, as well as serving as volunteers at local hospitals and the Maryland School for the Blind. For more than thirty years, the church has hosted a weekly meeting of Alcoholics Anonymous. The church has sponsored Boy Scout Troop 102 since 1999, graduating seven Eagle Scouts in 2021.

The large size of the sanctuary and its convenient location make it well-suited for community gatherings attracting sizable crowds, such as concerts by the Handel Choir of Baltimore. The church hosts an annual memorial service for fallen Baltimore County firefighters and rescue personnel. Senior Baltimore County officials, including the County Executive and Fire Chief, participate in the service's memorial wreath laying and the tolling of a bell, as part of the commemoration. Nationally known guest speakers, such as Tony Campolo and Millie Dienert, have also spoken there.

Towson United Methodist Church started the Hampton Lane Child Development Center in 1978. An accredited child care center, it now serves approximately fifty children ages 2–5 years old.
