= Discount Tire =

American tire chain store

Reinalt-Thomas Corporation
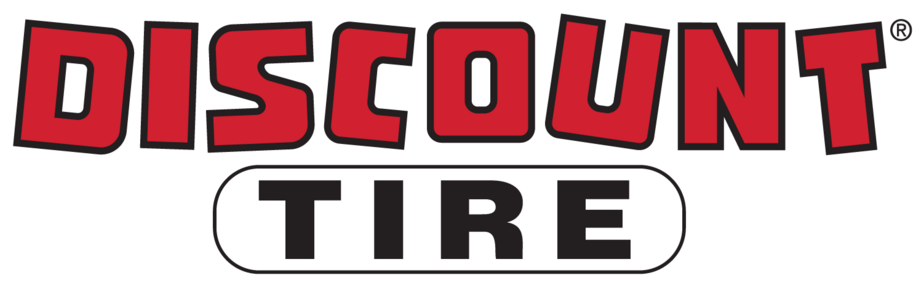

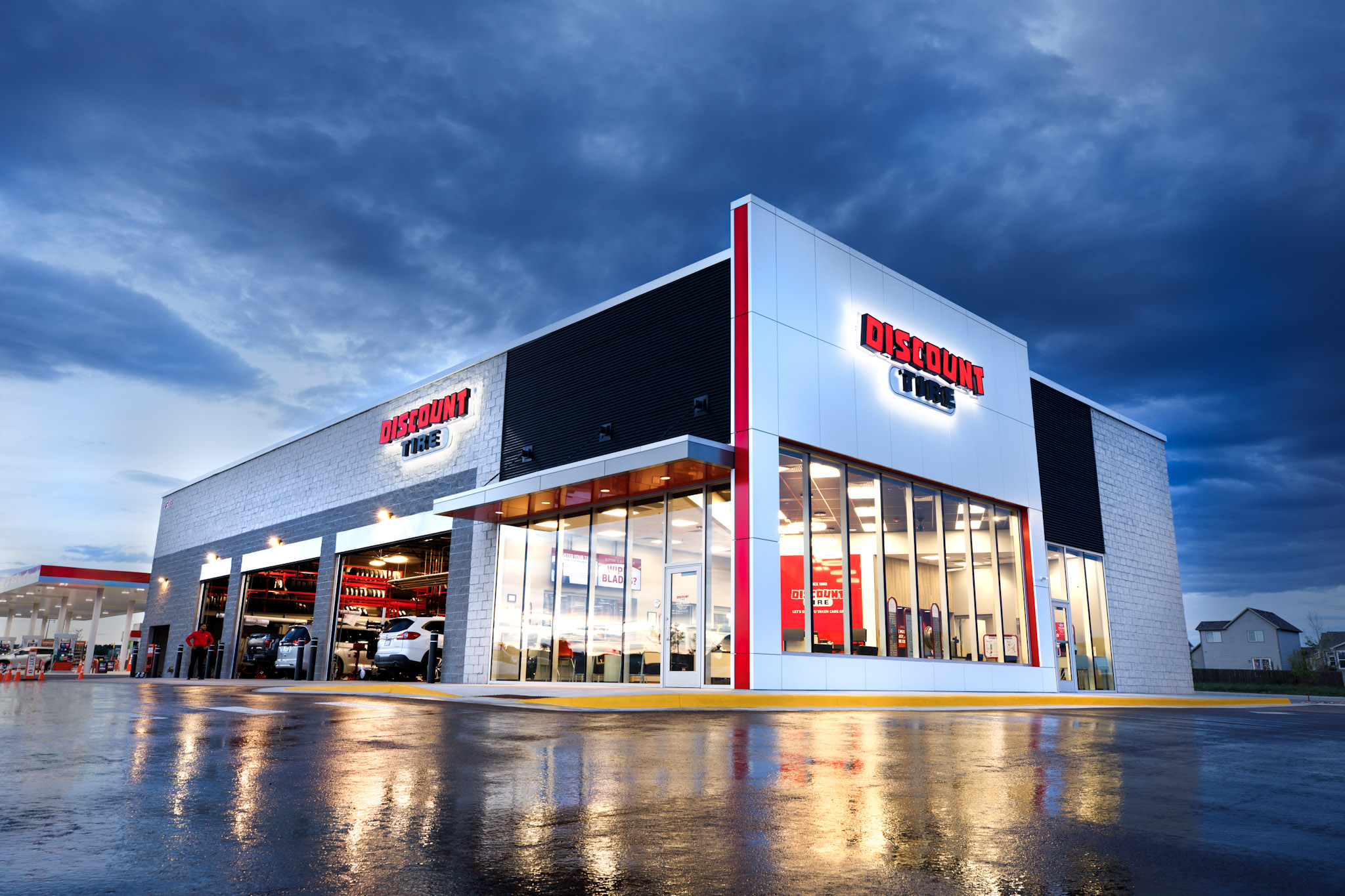
- Discount Tire store in Colorado
- Trade name: Discount Tire; America's Tire
- Type: Private
- Industry: Automotive part retailer
- Founded: 1960; 66 years ago Ann Arbor, Michigan, U.S.
- Founder: Bruce Halle
- Headquarters: Scottsdale, Arizona, U.S.
- Number of locations: 1,275+ stores in 40 states (2026)
- Area served: Most of the contiguous United States
- Key people: Michael Zuieback (Executive chairman); Dean Muglia (CEO); Christian Roe (CFO)
- Products: Tires; Wheels; dTPMS sensors; Lug nuts; Windshield wiper blades
- Services: Tire rotations; Tire balancing; Flat tire repair; dTPMS maintenance; Wheel alignments
- Revenue: ▲US$9.7 billion (2024)
- Number of employees: ▲30,972 (2026)
- Subsidiaries: Dunn Tire & Auto Tire Rack; Suburban Tire Auto Repair Centers
- Website: discounttire.com

The Reinalt-Thomas Corporation, doing business as Discount Tire and America's Tire, is an American tire and wheel retailer. It operates in 40 of the lower 48 states, and is headquartered in Scottsdale, Arizona. Founded in 1960, it is an independent retailer of tires and wheels.

== Company History ==
=== Founding and initial growth ===
Discount Tire Company was founded by Bruce Halle as a tire shop in 1960, in Ann Arbor, Michigan. Halle had taken out a $400 loan to open the store, originally having six tires from a previous failed automotive supply company. In 1970, the company expanded to Arizona, with its headquarters being built in Scottsdale, Arizona. The company grew to over 200 stores by 1990 and opened its 500th store in 2002.

Gary Van Brunt was appointed as CEO in 1999 and served until 2004. Tom Englert succeeded him as CEO, having initially started as a store employee three decades prior. In 2015, he stepped down and was replaced by Michael Zuieback, the stepson of Halle.

On September 10, 2018, the 1000th store was opened in Phoenix, Arizona.

=== Further expansion and diversification ===
In 2020, Dean Muglia succeeded Zuieback as CEO, although Zuieback remained the executive chairman. Muglia stated that "nothing is off the table" in regard to future services, where the company had initially provided solely tire and wheel services.

A store was opened in Pittsburgh, Pennsylvania, in February 2020, marking the company's entry into the northeastern United States.

In mid-2021, Discount Tire partnered with Trico and began selling windshield wiper blades. It then acquired Tire Rack on December 31, 2021. This was followed by the acquisition of Dunn Tire & Auto, a chain of full-service maintenance shops, on September 30, 2023, expanding their presence to New York. Discount Tire offers mobile tire installation at some of its stores, in which technicians install tires at a customer's home or workplace. As of 2024 the service was available in 11 states. In April 2024, Discount Tire acquired Suburban Tire Auto Repair Centers, a chain of automotive shops serving the Chicago metropolitan area. Today

On December 27, 2022, Discount Tire announced it would be building a new headquarters in Phoenix. On December 27, 2024, the company announced it had acquired Desert Ridge Corporate Center, a 275,208-square-foot office space located one mile away from the land acquired in 2022. As of July 2025, construction of a new headquarters has not begun.

In the mid-2020s, America’s Tire, the regional brand used by Discount Tire in certain markets, expanded into New Jersey for the first time with the opening of a store in Burlington County. News coverage of the expansion reported that the company operates approximately 1,250 retail locations across 40 U.S. states.

== Products ==
While Discount Tire does not manufacture tires, it sells brands made by external manufacturers as "exclusive" tires. Some manufacturers like Yokohama Tire sell exclusive models to Discount Tire, while still having other tires available with other retailers.

Exclusive tire brands sold by Discount Tire
Brand	Manufacturer	
Arizonian	Cooper Tire & Rubber Company	
Road Hugger	Nitto Tire	Kumho Tire
Phantom	Kumho Tire	
Pathfinder	Hankook	
Rocky Mountain	Giti Tire	Nankang Rubber Tire
Range Finder	Kumho Tire	
Rage	Vision Tire	
Sentury	Sentury Tire	
Mohave	Sentury Tire	
Corsa	Omni United	
Encompass AW02	Nokian Tyres	
Pro G5	Falken Tire	
YK	Yokohama	

== Corporate identity ==
=== Regional names ===
Discount Tire operates as America's Tire in regions where other entities already use the same or similar name. This includes a majority of California, and other isolated instances such as in northeastern Pennsylvania.

After the purchasing of Dunn Tire, Discount Tire elected to keep Dunn Tire operating under its current name and branding.

=== Marketing ===
==== Commercials ====
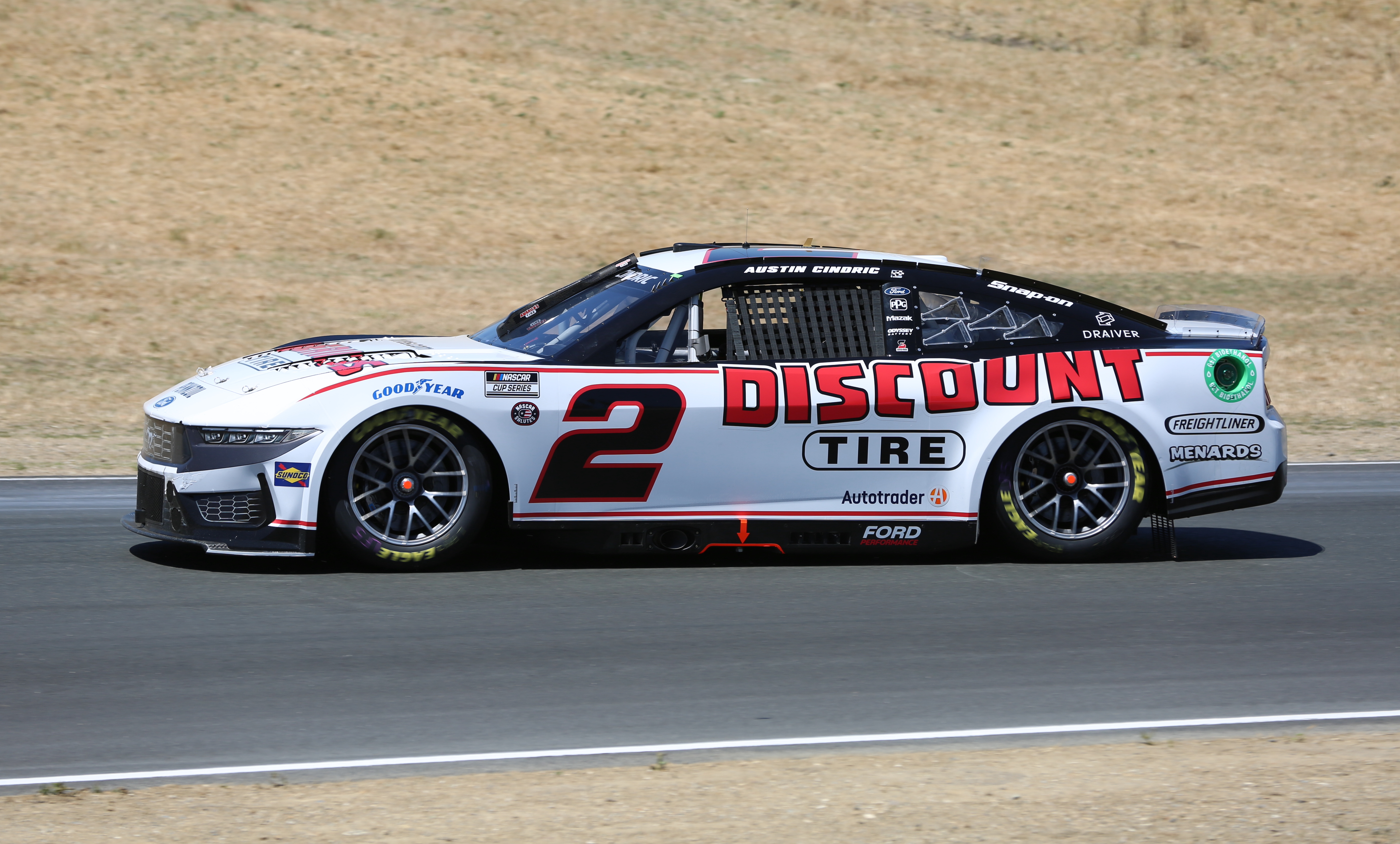
Cindric's Discount Tire NASCAR

In 2005, Discount Tire received a world record from Guinness World Records for the longest continuously running TV commercial, depicting an old woman, played by Maxine Olmstead, hurling a tire through a store window. The commercial first aired in 1975.

==== Sponsorships ====
Discount Tire sponsors the Team Penske No. 2 and No. 12 Ford Mustangs in the NASCAR Cup Series, driven by Austin Cindric and Ryan Blaney respectively.

In the past, Discount Tire has been a sponsor of the AMA Supercross, The College Basketball Invitational, Women's National Basketball Association along with Continental AG.

In 2024, Discount Tire became the Official Tire Retailer of Major League Soccer and Elite Clubs National League.

== Research and testing ==
In 2022, Discount Tire acquired Treadwell Research Park, a nearly 900-acre tire testing and research facility located in Pearsall, Texas. Industry reporting describes the facility as including multiple test tracks and specialized surfaces used to evaluate tire performance characteristics such as braking, handling, traction, and noise under different driving conditions. According to reporting, Discount Tire says the facility allows the company to conduct impartial third-party testing of tire models. Data collected through testing at the research facility is incorporated into its proprietary tire evaluation system, Treadwell, which is offered as an online tire recommendation guide on its website and used in its retail operations.

In 2021, Discount Tire introduced handheld tread-depth scanners, which measure tread depth by laser and read the DOT code stamped on a tire's sidewall in less than five seconds. This reduces reliance on manual measurement and hand-written notes. The tread-depth measurements collected at its stores nationwide are used in its Treadwell tire recommendation tool.

== Controversies ==
=== Politics ===
==== Endorsement of Joe Arpaio ====
In August 2016, posters for Maricopa County Sheriff Joe Arpaio's reelection campaign were posted inside store windows. This attracted outcry from opponents of Arpaio, especially in the Latino community due to Arpaio having been found to have been racially profiling Latinos in federal court.

==== Anti-marijuana lobbying ====
In October 2016, Halle and Discount Tire donated $1 million to the Arizonians for Responsible Drug Policy, a group which campaigned against the marijuana-legalization bill Proposition 205. In response, a boycott was initiated against the company.

==== Santa Clara incident ====
In October 2021, a customer reported damages done to his BMW Z by an America's Tire store in Santa Clara, California. Footage from their dashcam revealed that the store's employees discussing having thrown parts at the vehicle. The footage also shows the vehicle being driven at excessive speed, while the employees mocking the owner based on his Asian American name. The footage was posted on Instagram, where it attracted media attention. After the incident, the Discount Tire's PR team reported that the involved employees were terminated by the location and that the customer's damage would be reimbursed.

== Litigation ==
=== Mavis Discount Tire rebranding lawsuit ===
On December 26, 2018, Discount Tire successfully filed a lawsuit against Mavis Discount Tire over their usage of "Discount Tire" in the Midwest and the South. Mavis had previously operated as Mavis Discount Tire in the northeast, a market in which Discount Tire had not yet entered.
