= WEMU =

Radio station at Eastern Michigan University, Ypsilanti, Michigan

- Ypsilanti, Michigan; United States
- Broadcast area: Washtenaw County, Michigan
- Frequency: 89.1 MHz (HD Radio)

Programming
- Format: Public radio and jazz
- Subchannels: HD2: Jazz
- Affiliations: NPR; PRX

Ownership
- Owner: Eastern Michigan University

History
- First air date: December 8, 1965
- Call sign meaning: Eastern Michigan University

Technical information
- Licensing authority: FCC
- Facility ID: 18311
- Class: B1
- Power: 15,500 watts
- HAAT: 88 meters (289 ft)
- Transmitter coordinates: 42°15′48″N 83°37′34″W

Links
- Public license information: Public file; LMS
- Website: wemu.org

WEMU (89.1 FM) is a noncommercial radio station licensed to Ypsilanti, Michigan, United States, serving Washtenaw County, Ann Arbor and the western suburbs of Detroit. Owned by Eastern Michigan University, it is an NPR member station carrying news and Information shows mornings and afternoons, with jazz music heard the rest of the day. On weekends, a mix of jazz, blues, adult alternative and Latin jazz shows are heard, along with some NPR weekend talk shows and EMU sports broadcasts.

WEMU's studios are located inside the Timko Broadcast Center on the ground floor (G01) of Halle Library next to the Mark Jefferson Science Complex on the campus of Eastern Michigan University on West Circle Drive near the corner of Cross Street and Oakwood Street, and its transmitter is located near the EMU campus on West Clark Road at Laforge Road, both in Ypsilanti.

== History ==
WEMU signed on the air on December 8, 1965. It originally broadcast on 88.1 MHz with studios in the Quirk Building on Eastern Michigan University's campus. In 1976, the station moved to King Hall, and in February 1977, WEMU began to feature a primarily jazz format. Later that year, in October 1977, WEMU changed to its current 89.1 FM frequency. The next major addition came on April 7, 2004, when WEMU added digital broadcasting. Located online at WEMU.org, the station streams live 24 hours a day.

According to a 2017 tour of WEMU, the station holds one of the largest jazz broadcast libraries in the United States, with nearly 100,000 records and CDs in its collection.

Still broadcast out of King Hall on the Eastern Michigan University Campus, WEMU currently shares the building with the student newspaper The Eastern Echo and the Early College Alliance program.

== Programming ==
WEMU carries the drive time NPR news programs All Things Considered and Morning Edition, in addition to other NPR and Public Radio International (PRI) information and cultural programming. WEMU also hosts the EMU sports network and carries EMU football and basketball broadcasts.

According to the WEMU radio schedule, weekdays offer six hours of locally hosted jazz between Morning Edition and All Things Considered, with the syndicated jazz show Pubjazz overnight. Local weekday jazz show include 89.1 Jazz with Michael Jewett and The Break. Starting on Friday nights, weekend programming includes a mix of news and music shows, both local and national. Weekend local shows include From Memphis to Motown, The Roots Music Project, Cuban Fantasy, Sunday Best, Grooveyard, The In Crowd, and Big City Blues Cruise.

WEMU is licensed for HD Radio operations. It broadcasts a mixed format of traditional and smooth jazz on its HD2 digital subchannel. The HD2 formerly aired a mix of folk, roots and Americana music.

== See also ==
- Campus radio
- List of college radio stations in the United States
