= Bruce T. Halle Library =

Library in Ypsilanti, Michigan

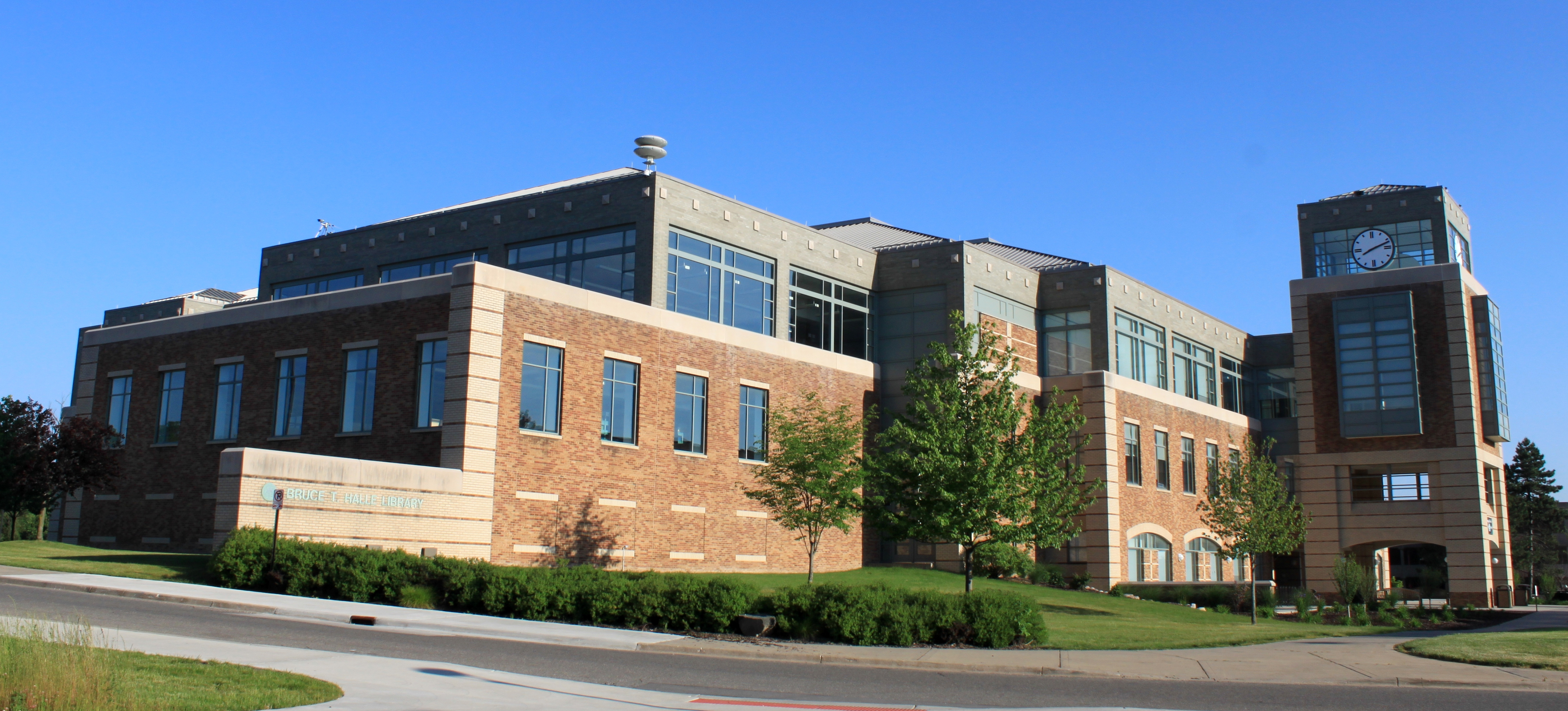
- 42.2487°N 83.6276°W
- Location: Ypsilanti, Michigan
- Type: Academic library
- Established: 1998

Collection
- Size: Over 1 million books

Access and use
- Population served: Eastern Michigan University

Other information
- Director: Rhonda Fowler
- Website: www.emich.edu/library/

The Bruce T. Halle Library, often referred to as Halle Library, is the sole library on the Eastern Michigan University campus. It houses one of the largest collections of children's literature in the United States.

Halle Library features an advanced automated shelving system, the Automated Retrieval Collection (ARC). While the most-used books are still on public shelves, the majority of the library's books are stored within this system, which runs several stories underneath the library itself. The library is named for EMU graduate Bruce Halle, founder of Discount Tire.

== History ==
The first library on campus was a single room in the Old Main administration building. The first dedicated library building was built in 1929, which was succeeded in 1967 by a new University Library. The 1929 library is now R. Clyde Ford Hall, housing the School of Art and Design, and the 1967 library is now the John W. Porter Building, housing the College of Education.

The previous University Library had become overcrowded by the early 1990s, leading to student protests in 1992. Halle Library was constructed on the site of the former physical plant, on the west side of campus. Construction began in 1995, and the new library opened in 1998. The construction cost $41 million, equivalent to $80.99 million in 2025.

A portion of the library's construction was funded by a $1.5 million endowment from EMU graduate Bruce T. Halle.

== Facility ==
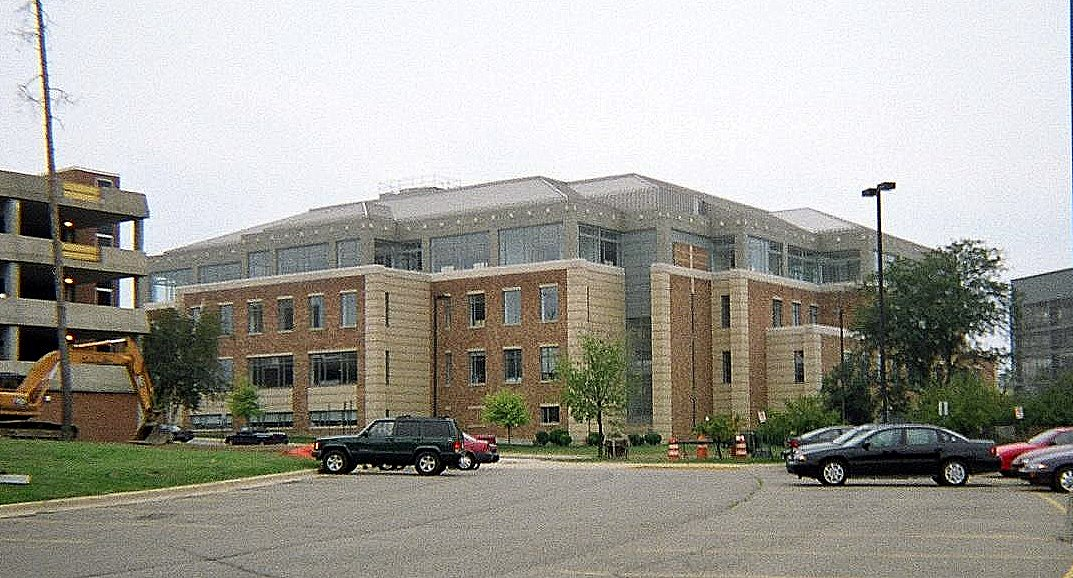
Library from northeast corner

The 4-story library is 270,000 square feet (25,000 m^{2}) and contains close to a million volumes split between a browsing level and an automated retrieval system (ARC). The building was designed to contain 520 computer stations, 1,500 network connections, wireless internet, and a 70-seat teleconferencing room. The computer stations are broken down into a video studio, 6 computer classrooms, and 3 large computer labs.

In addition to library collections, the Halle Library hosts other university resources, including an IT help desk, the Holman Success Center, the Academic Projects Center, and the University Writing Center.

The library features an electronic carillon, which is heard from over 1.5 miles (2.4 km) away. Additional amenities include a 100-seat auditorium, meeting rooms, and a cafe.

== Collection ==
Halle Library holds a large collection of children's literature, one of the largest in the United States. The Education Resources Collection complements the children's literature collection, with textbooks and lesson plans for K-12 teachers. These collections reflect EMU's origins as a teachers' college and the continued focus on education programs. The library is also a member of the Federal Depository Library Program.

The library building was designed around the Automated Retrieval Collection (ARC), an automated storage and retrieval system. The ARC is three stories underground, with a capacity of 800,000 items, and is integrated with the library catalog. Items requested from the ARC are available within an hour.

Halle Library was the second university library in the United States to successfully implement an automated storage and retrieval system, after the University Library at California State University, Northridge. The technology of the Halle Library ARC is based on a commercial system for storing small automotive parts.

== Namesake ==
The library is named after Bruce Halle, the founder of Discount Tire, and a graduate of Eastern Michigan University. Halle enrolled at the Michigan State Normal College, as EMU was then known, in 1948. Halle withdrew from college before graduating to enlist in the Marine Corps. He returned to the university after his service, and graduated in 1956 with a BBA. Halle went on to open the first Discount Tire store in nearby Ann Arbor, expanding into a national chain, which he remained in control of until his death in 2018.

== See also ==
- Discount Tire
- Automated storage and retrieval system
