= Nancy Brown Peace Carillon =

Bell tower in Detroit, Michigan, US

Coordinates: 42°20′7″N 82°59′19″W

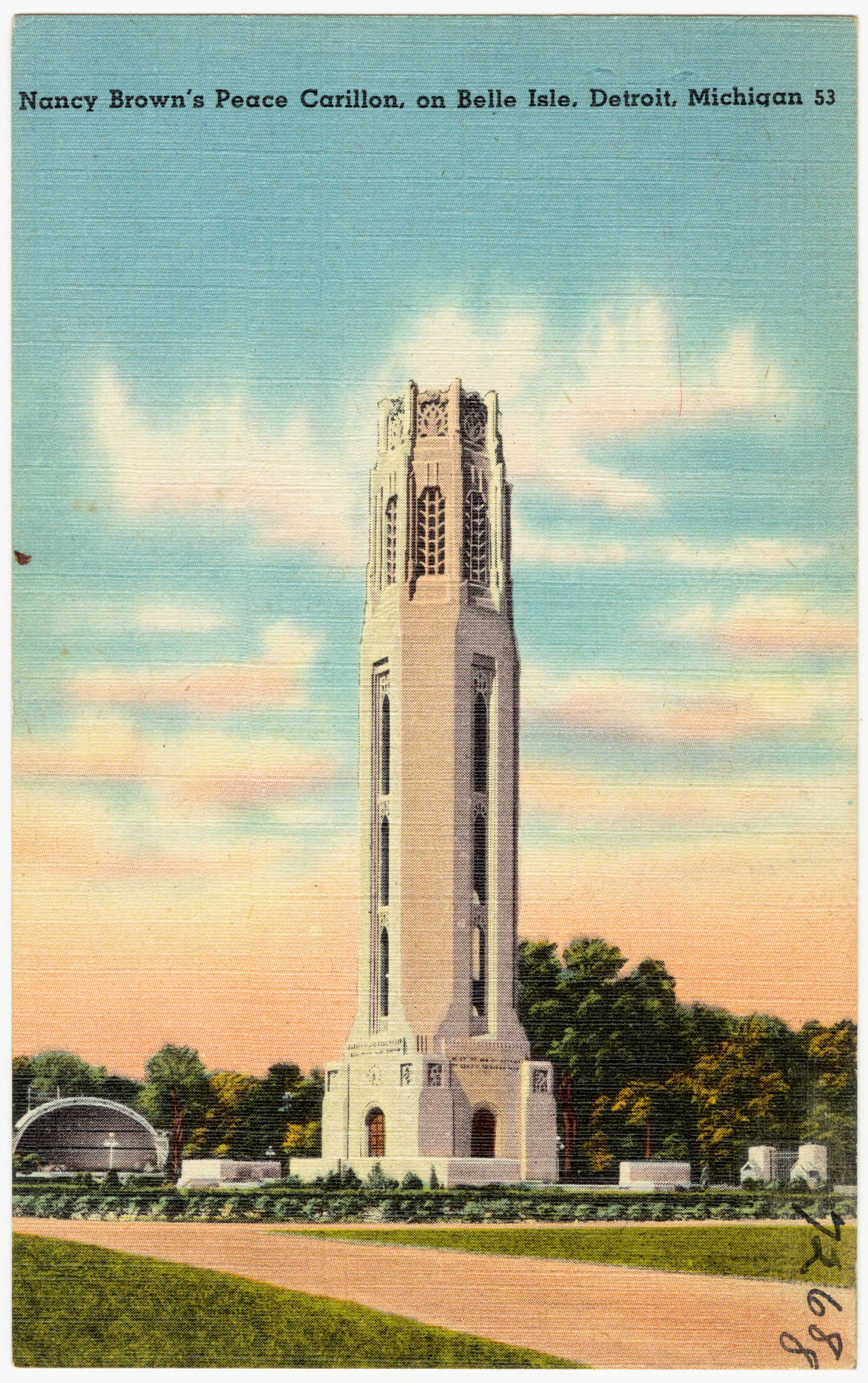
Nancy Brown Peace Carillon, postcard circa 1940–45

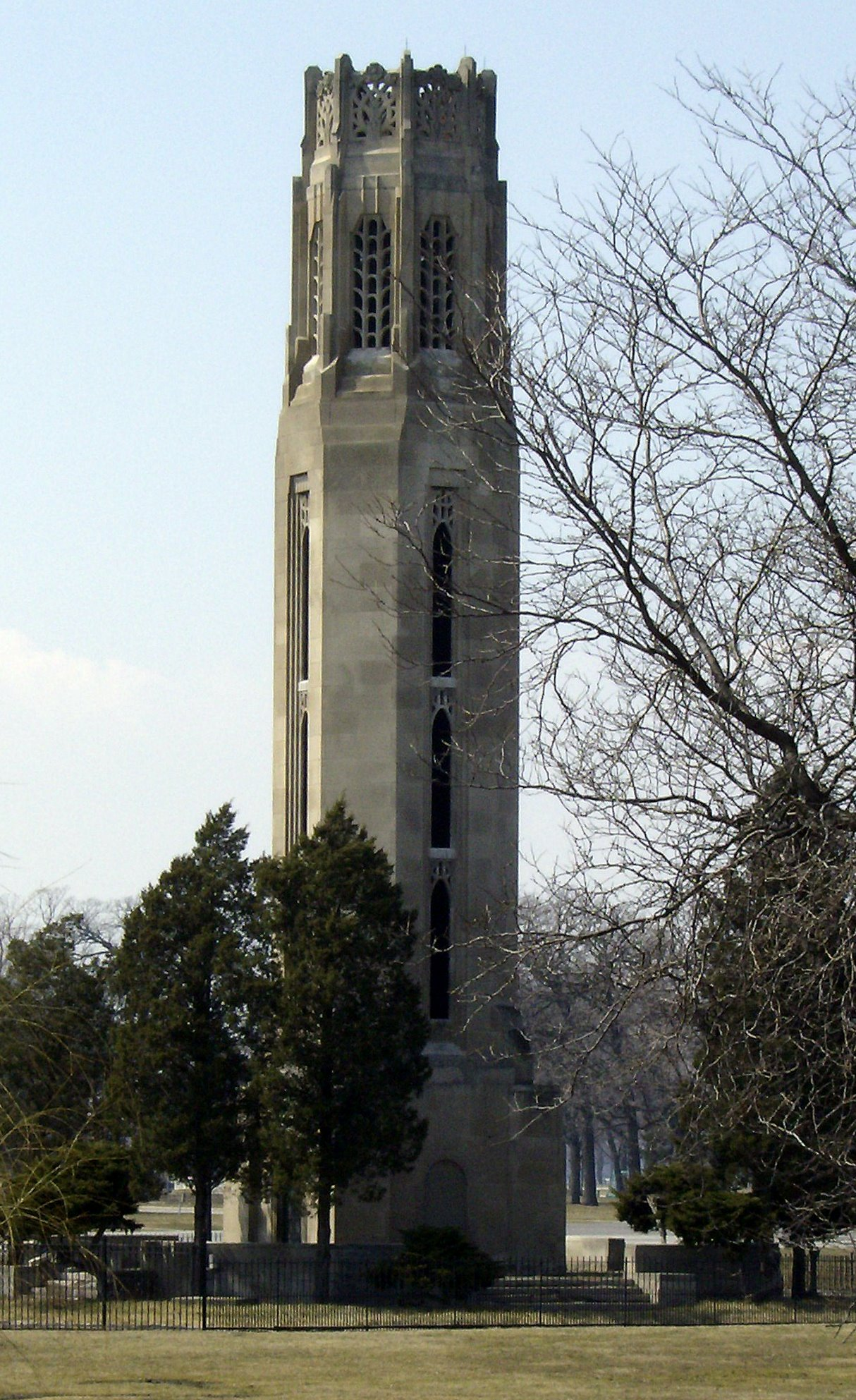
The carillon in 2008

The Nancy Brown Peace Carillon is a bell tower containing an electronic carillon on Detroit's Belle Isle. It is dedicated to peace and named after Nancy Brown, the pseudonym of The Detroit News columnist Mrs. J. E. Leslie (born Annie Louise Brown). Brown began writing for the newspaper in 1919, held her first religious "Sunrise Service" (drawing approximately 50,000 people) on Belle Isle in 1934, and began a campaign to raise money to build a peace carillon on the island in 1936. Brown herself broke the ground for the carillon on October 30, 1939, and its cornerstone was laid on December 13 of that year. A notable backer of the project was John C. Lodge, a former mayor of Detroit and a member of the Detroit Common Council.

The Nancy Brown Peace Carillon is octagonal in cross-sectional shape, 98 feet (30 m) in height, and located near the band shell on Belle Isle. Designed by the architectural firm of Harley, Ellington, and Day, the tower is neo-Gothic in design; according to the American Institute of Architects, its appearance is "at once stately and cheerfully unpretentious". The carillon was completed at a total cost of approximately $60,000; the money was raised entirely by donations from Brown's Detroit News readers and related fund-raisers, and the tower was completed without expense to the city. It was dedicated during the seventh annual Sunrise Service on June 16, 1940, which was attended by roughly 50,000 people. The first concert at the Nancy Brown Peace Carillon was held on Independence Day, July 4, 1940, and featured American patriotic music such as "America the Beautiful", the "Battle Hymn of the Republic", and "The Star-Spangled Banner". The very last penny to cover the carillon's cost of construction was donated on December 7, 1941, the day of the attack on Pearl Harbor. Brown continued writing her column, titled "Experience", until January 1942, and she retired from The Detroit News the following month. She died in Detroit on October 7, 1948, at the age of 77, and was buried at Oakview Cemetery in Royal Oak.

The tower was originally intended to feature bells; because of their prohibitive cost, it was instead built to simulate bells using an organ and amplifier. By 1970, the carillon had ceased playing music due to damage caused by pigeons, while some of its stained glass windows had been destroyed by vandalism. That year, while Detroit faced a $22.5 million deficit, then-current general superintendent of the city's Department of Parks and Recreation, John May, observed that "we haven’t got the money to repair it". In 1974, the Parks and Recreation Department voiced its hopes to replace the organ and amplifier with an 8-track system that would play recordings of carillon bells; at the same time, the Friends of Belle Isle endeavored to purchase and install real bells in the carillon, which would have cost approximately $100,000. New chimes were ultimately installed in the carillon in 2003.

By 2012, the Nancy Brown Peace Carillon had been automated and was playing music daily. However, by 2013, local writer John Gallagher said it had suffered from both neglect and vandalism for an extended period of time, and that it was in need of maintenance. In remembrance of the 50th anniversary of the 1967 Detroit riot, an event entitled "67 Seconds of Peace" was held at the carillon in September 2017. It was led by Church of the Messiah pastor Barry Randolph and also featured a reading of "Poem for Belle Isle" by author Marsha Music as well as a presentation by historian Jamon Jordan.

== See also ==
- List of carillons in the United States
