= Street Survival =

Street Survival is a teen driving program governed by the BMW CCA Foundation. Through the volunteer efforts of members of the BMW Car Club of America, the Sports Car Club of America, the Mercedes-Benz Club of America, the Porsche Club of America and the Audi Club of North America as well as other automotive enthusiasts who serve as the personal coach with each teen, over 100 schools will be held across the U.S. this year.

== Mission ==
The school's aim is to reduce deadly car crashes involving teenagers by providing them a controlled setting where they can gain invaluable experience in car control, all with a knowledgeable coach always at their side helping them to understand how important experience is over guessing when the unexpected happens on the road. The volunteers give of their time and talents to help our most valuable resource, young people, gain experience that will allow them to make educated decisions when driving, rather than guessing what to do and whether they, their passenger or others sharing the road with them, will live or die.

== Partnership ==
Scott Goodyear, veteran IndyCar driver and expert race analyst, has partnered with the Tire Rack Street Survival program. Goodyear shares his expertise and knowledge as a professional driver with teen drivers enrolled in select Tire Rack Street Survival programs across the country. Ross Bentley has served as a consultant in the curriculum. The program has hosted over 600 schools and over 10,000 students in its history.

== See also ==
- Advanced driving test
