= BMW CCA Foundation =

BMW Car Club of America Foundation
- Established: March 2002; 23 years ago
- Mission: Dedicated to the Promotion of Safety and the Preservation of History
- Key people: Lance White - President; Bruce Smith - Vice President; Louis Goldsman - Treasurer; John Eveland - Secretary
- Address: 190 Manatee Court, Greer, South Carolina, 29651
- Location: Greer, South Carolina
- Website: bmwccafoundation.org

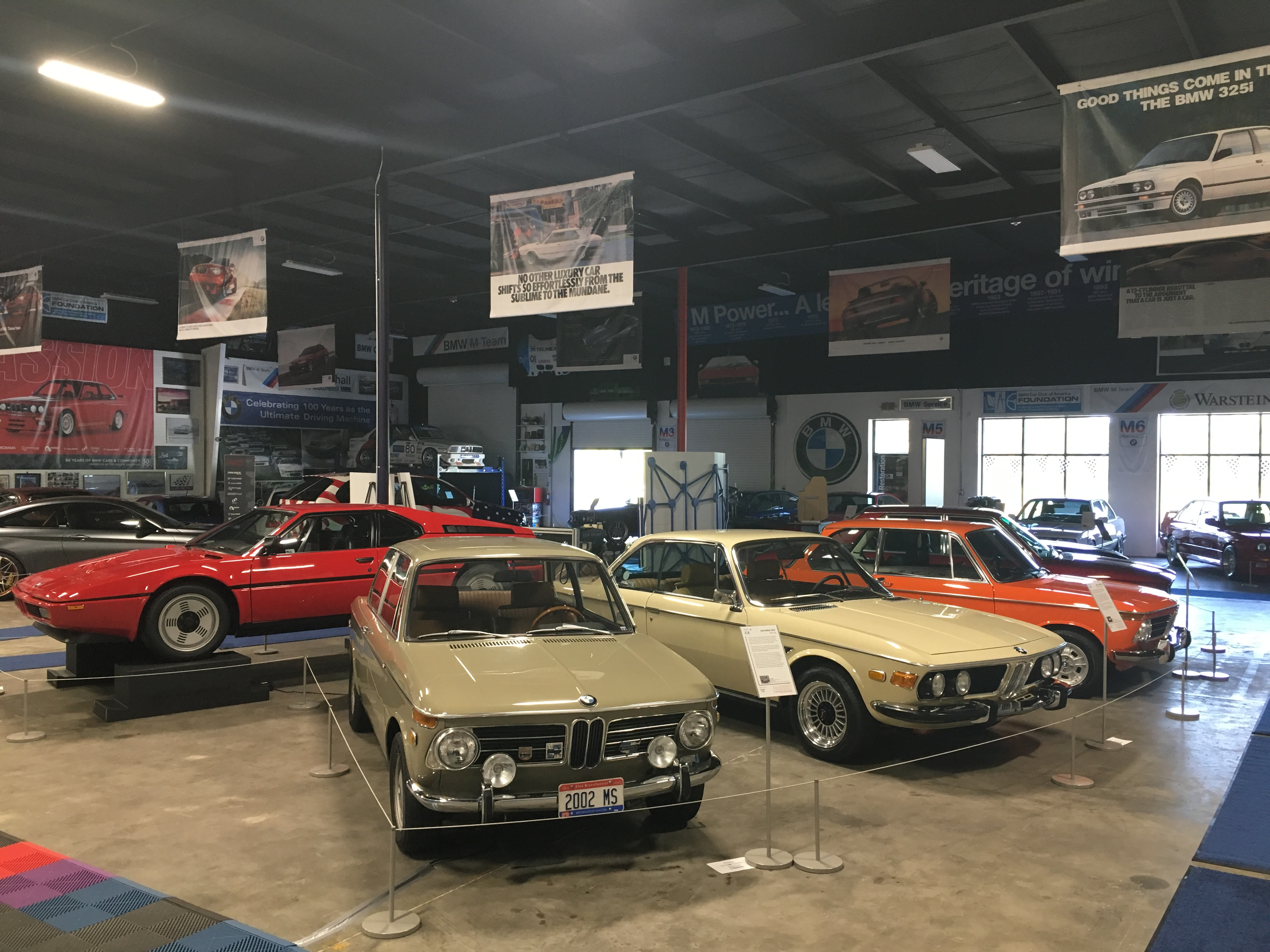
Fall 2019 Exhibit at the BMW CCA Foundation Museum

The BMW Car Club of America Foundation was formed in 2002 by the BMW Car Club of America to benefit BMW owners, enthusiasts, and the general public. As a 501(c)(3) non-profit charity, the Foundation operates a museum, library, and archives and a teen safe driving educational program.

The foundation focuses on two programs:

- The Library, Archives, and Museum Program
- The Teen Driver Safety Program (Street Survival)

== The Museum, Library, and Archives ==
The BMW CCA Foundation Museum displays a collection of Vintage BMW Cars, Motorcycles, and artifacts on a rotating basis. Each year, a new theme is selected for the annual exhibit, with a new selection of automobiles. The Library and Archives is a repository of BMW-related historical documents, literature, automobiles and memorabilia. This facility is in Greer, South Carolina near the BMW Car Club of America National Office, BMW Plant Spartanburg and the BMW Performance Center.

== The Driver Safety School Program ==
The Driver Safety Program promotes and conducts driving programs to improve the car handling skills of young drivers, especially teenagers, with the aim of reducing accidents. This program is headlined by the “Tire Rack Street Survival Teen Driving Program” that is conducted across the United States. Additionally, this program features Car Control Clinics for drivers of all ages to learn the dynamics of their cars in emergency situations in a safe and controlled environment.
