= Bruce Halle =

American businessman (1930–2018)

Bruce T. Halle
- Born: Bruce Thomas Halle; May 27, 1930; Springfield, Massachusetts, US
- Died: January 4, 2018 (aged 87); Paradise Valley, Arizona, US
- Education: Eastern Michigan University
- Spouse(s): Gerry (until 1989; her death); Diane Meyers Halle (m. 1999–2018; his death)
- Children: 4

Bruce Thomas Halle (May 27, 1930 – January 4, 2018) was an American businessman, and the founder and chairman of Discount Tire. He was the wealthiest person in Arizona, with an estimated net worth of $5.2 billion at the time of his death.

== Early life and education ==
Bruce Halle was born on May 27, 1930, in Springfield, Massachusetts as the second of seven children to Catholic parents, Frederick Joseph "Fred" Halle Sr. and his wife, Marry Elizabeth "Molly" McKelvey; both married in 1927. His French-Canadian grandfather, Alfred Antoine Halle, had come to Berlin, New Hampshire, from Quebec in the mid-1880s with his wife and two sons. As a young boy, during the Great Depression, he supported his family by delivering newspapers, cutting grass and digging graves. Bruce's parents returned home with their two sons to Berlin, where they would lived with Molly's parents at a home few blocks from St. Kieran's Catholic Church. His father became a firefighter at the Berlin Fire Department and later made deputy chief. In 1942, his family moved to Detroit, where Fred worked as a security guard at the Ford Motor Company's Rouge River plant in Michigan. In 1950, Bruce went to enlist in the US Marine Corps and served a tour of duty in the Korean War. He later settled in Michigan and graduated with a BBA from Eastern Michigan University in 1956.

== Career ==
After graduating from college, he took a series of jobs by selling cars and life insurance. He tried unsuccessfully to form a partnership with his high school friend, Bill DiDonato, on an auto supply distribution company in Ypsilanti, Michigan and by late 1959, the business went bankrupt.

In 1960, he borrowed $400 and opened a tire store in Ann Arbor, Michigan. In 1964, he opened his second store and by 1970, he had seven stores in Michigan and expanded to Arizona that same year. It later became known as Discount Tire, and grew to over 1000 stores in 28 states by 2018.

As of 2014, he was the 248th richest person in the world, 87th richest in the US, and richest in Arizona, with an estimated wealth of US$6 billion.

== Philanthropy ==
Through the Bruce T. Halle Family Foundation, he made charitable donations to the Diane Halle Center for Family Justice at Arizona State University and to the Children First Academy, the nation's largest school for homeless children. He made donations to the American Heart Association, the American Cancer Society, the American Liver Foundation, the American Red Cross, the National Multiple Sclerosis Society, Childhelp, the Juvenile Diabetes Foundation, and the Muscular Dystrophy Association.

In Arizona, he supported the Arizona Boys and Girls Clubs, the Arizona Opera League, the Phoenix Symphony, the Scottsdale Symphony, the Crisis Nursery, the Arizona Kidney Foundation, and the Phoenix Children's Hospital. He was the first to pledge charter membership of the Children's Urban Survival Program in Phoenix. The Bruce T. Halle Library on his alma mater's campus is named for him, and the Diane M. Halle Library on Endicott College's campus is named after his second wife.

He had a collection of 400 lithographs from the earliest days of tire advertisements. The Diane and Bruce Halle Collection is a private collection of 20th- and 21st-century art from Latin America based in Scottsdale, Arizona.

== Political activities ==
In 2016 at the direction of Halle, Discount Tire stores in Maricopa County posted "Re-Elect Sheriff Joe Arpaio" signs in their windows.

Halle was also a supporter of the Tea Party movement throughout the Obama Presidency, including his financial support for the "Tea Party Patriots Citizen Fund" and "Tea Party Leadership Fund". He was a financial supporter of the National Association for Gun Rights, an organization self-described as "Accepting 'NO COMPROMISE' on the issue of gun control."

In 2016, he donated $1 million to Arizonans for Responsible Drug Policy in an effort to stop cannabis legalization in Arizona.

== Personal life ==
Halle married his childhood sweetheart, Geraldine "Gerry" Konfara Halle, in the late 1940s, and she died in 1989 from cancer. According to his biographer, Gerry's death was a "huge, huge blow" to him. Bruce Halle's children were all born with his first wife Gerry. They had 3 children, Bruce Jr., Susan, and Lisa Pedersen.

Halle married his second wife, Diane Meyers Halle (née Cummings), ten years later in 1999. Diane was a widow of another Arizona millionaire. They lived in Paradise Valley, Arizona.

Halle died on January 4, 2018, at the age of 87. He was survived by three children, his wife, a brother, and two sisters.

== See also ==
- TBC Corporation
