= Hampton, Maryland =

- Census-designated place
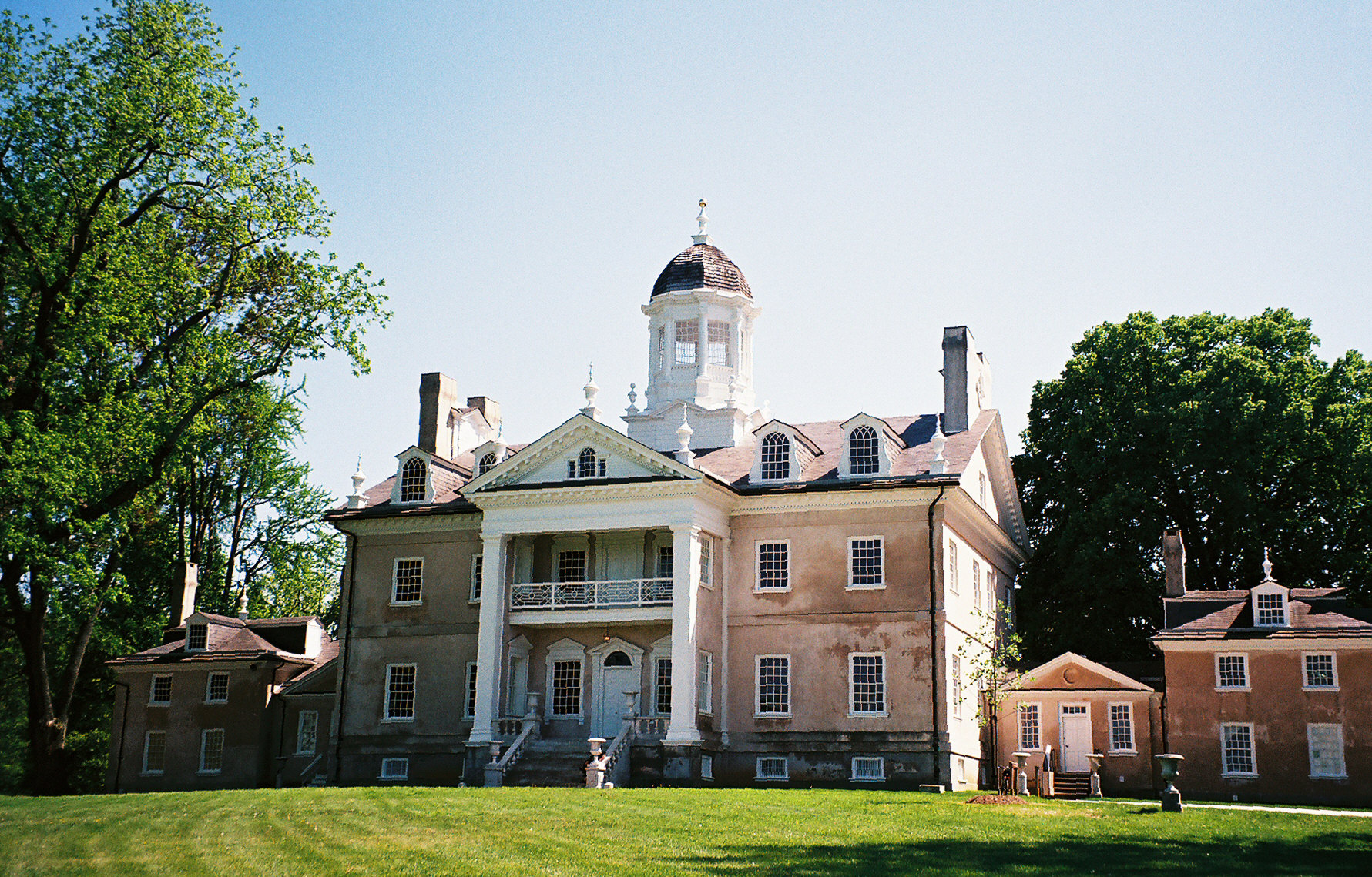
- The Hampton National Historic Site in Hampton, Maryland

- Location of Hampton in the State of Maryland
- Coordinates: 39°25′22″N 76°35′5″W
- Country: United States
- State: Maryland
- County: Baltimore

Area
  - Total: 6.35 sq mi (16.45 km^{2})
  - Land: 5.95 sq mi (15.41 km^{2})
  - Water: 0.40 sq mi (1.04 km^{2})
- Elevation: 338 ft (103 m)

Population (2020)
  - Total: 5,180
  - Density: 870.4/sq mi (336.08/km^{2})
- Time zone: UTC-5 (Eastern (EST))
  - Summer (DST): UTC-4 (EDT)
- ZIP codes: 21286, 21093
- Area code: 410 / 443
- FIPS code: 24-36512
- GNIS feature ID: 0590409

Hampton is an unincorporated community and census-designated place (CDP) in Baltimore County, Maryland, United States. The population was 5,052 at the 2010 census. Hampton is often considered a subdivision of the nearby community of Towson and is located just north of Baltimore, about twenty minutes from downtown. Hampton contains residences situated on lots up to several acres in a park-like setting (current zoning limits density to not more than two residential units per acre). The community is anchored by its principal landmark, the Hampton National Historic Site. The Towson United Methodist Church is located in Hampton, flanked on the south by I-695 and Goucher College.

== History ==
In ancient times, the land was frequented by Susquehannock Indians, who used what became nearby Joppa Road as a trail. The area now known as Hampton was originally part of a land grant given to a relative of Lord Baltimore in 1695. His heirs sold the land on April 2, 1745, to Col. Charles Ridgely, a tobacco farmer and trader. In the latter half of the 18th century, the Hampton Mansion was built by the Ridgely family, who used the surrounding land for farming, including apple orchards and the breeding of thoroughbred race horses, along with slave quarters.

Succeeding generations of Ridgelys continued to own the land until 1929, when the Hampton Development Company was formed and the land around the Hampton Mansion was subdivided, creating the modern Hampton community. The Hampton Mansion continued to be owned by the Ridgely family until 1948, when the house and the remaining 43 acres (170,000 m^{2}) of the Ridgely estate were designated a National Historic Site and sold to a preservation trust, eventually to be acquired and now operated by the National Park Service.

In 1958, the Towson United Methodist Church completed construction of its large Georgian-style sanctuary with a 235-foot (72 m) spire on 16 acres (65,000 m^{2}) of land in Hampton. In 2008, the church announced plans to sell a 5-acre (20,000 m^{2}) outparcel of undeveloped, wooded property to a developer for construction of a senior housing complex. A zoning change application was submitted to Baltimore County to increase density to 16 residential units per acre. However, the Hampton Improvement Association, representing neighborhood residents, objected, saying they "oppose zoning changes that would allow higher density residential development and require trees to be knocked down". The church subsequently dropped plans for the development, saying it wished to remain a good neighbor. The church now has a walking path in the forested area for meditation, open to the public during daylight hours.

== Geography ==
Hampton is located at 39°25′22″N 76°35′5″W (39.4229, -76.5847).

According to the United States Census Bureau, the CDP has a total area of 5.7 square miles (15 km^{2}), all land.

=== Climate ===
The climate in this area is characterized by hot, humid summers and generally mild to cool winters. According to the Köppen Climate Classification system, Hampton has a humid subtropical climate, abbreviated "Cfa" on climate maps.

== Demographics ==
Historical population
Census	Pop.	Note	%±
1980	5,220		—
1990	4,926		−5.6%
2000	5,004		1.6%
2010	5,052		1.0%
2020	5,180		2.5%
U.S. Decennial Census

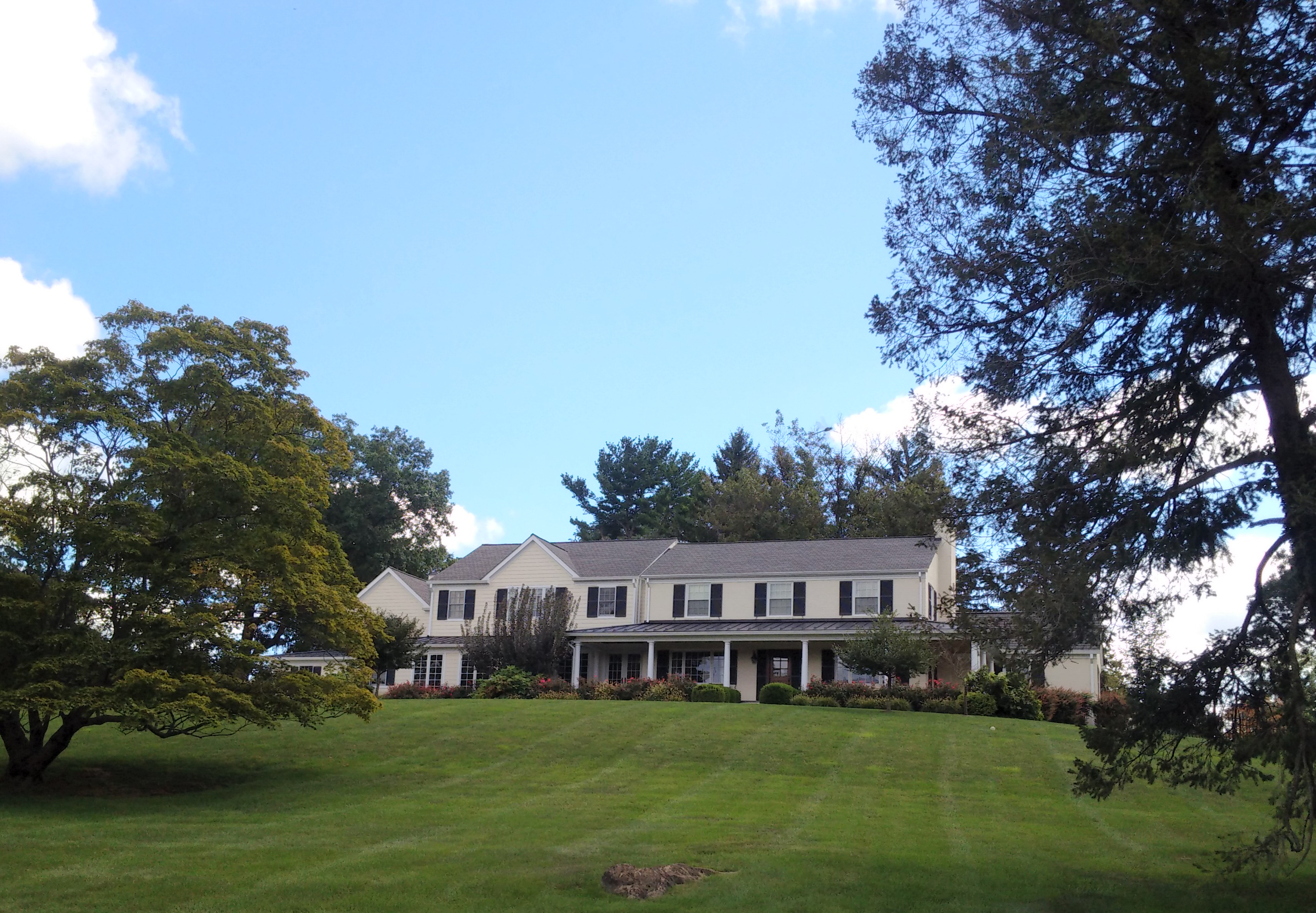
Typical residence in Hampton

=== Racial and ethnic composition ===
Hampton CDP, Maryland – Racial and ethnic composition Note: the US Census treats Hispanic/Latino as an ethnic category. This table excludes Latinos from the racial categories and assigns them to a separate category. Hispanics/Latinos may be of any race.
Race / Ethnicity (NH = Non-Hispanic)	Pop 2000	Pop 2010	Pop 2020	% 2000	% 2010	% 2020
White alone (NH)	4,518	4,479	4,387	90.29%	88.66%	84.69%
Black or African American alone (NH)	71	82	114	1.42%	1.62%	2.20%
Native American or Alaska Native alone (NH)	0	1	7	0.00%	0.02%	0.14%
Asian alone (NH)	300	275	324	6.00%	5.44%	6.25%
Native Hawaiian or Pacific Islander alone (NH)	1	0	3	0.02%	0.00%	0.06%
Other race alone (NH)	5	11	17	0.10%	0.22%	0.33%
Mixed race or Multiracial (NH)	35	86	194	0.70%	1.70%	3.75%
Hispanic or Latino (any race)	74	118	134	1.48%	2.34%	2.59%
Total	5,004	5,052	5,180	100.00%	100.00%	100.00%

=== 2020 census ===
As of the 2020 census, Hampton had a population of 5,180. The median age was 49.2 years. 21.4% of residents were under the age of 18 and 24.5% of residents were 65 years of age or older. For every 100 females there were 96.1 males, and for every 100 females age 18 and over there were 91.1 males age 18 and over.

99.8% of residents lived in urban areas, while 0.2% lived in rural areas.

There were 1,895 households in Hampton, of which 32.4% had children under the age of 18 living in them. Of all households, 73.4% were married-couple households, 8.2% were households with a male householder and no spouse or partner present, and 14.7% were households with a female householder and no spouse or partner present. About 14.6% of all households were made up of individuals and 9.0% had someone living alone who was 65 years of age or older.

There were 1,980 housing units, of which 4.3% were vacant. The homeowner vacancy rate was 1.1% and the rental vacancy rate was 7.7%.

=== 2000 census ===
As of the census of 2000, there were 5,004 people, 1,900 households, and 1,578 families residing in the CDP. The population density was 876.2 inhabitants per square mile (338.3/km^{2}). There were 1,935 housing units at an average density of 338.8 per square mile (130.8/km^{2}). The racial makeup of the CDP was 91.41% White, 1.48% African American, 6.00% Asian, 0.02% Pacific Islander, 0.22% from other races, and 0.88% from two or more races. Hispanic or Latino of any race were 1.48% of the population.

There were 1,900 households, out of which 29.1% had children under the age of 18 living with them, 75.3% were married couples living together, 5.7% had a female householder with no husband present, and 16.9% were non-families. 14.3% of all households were made up of individuals, and 8.8% had someone living alone who was 65 years of age or older. The average household size was 2.62 and the average family size was 2.89.

In the CDP, the population was spread out, with 21.9% under the age of 18, 4.1% from 18 to 24, 19.3% from 25 to 44, 30.1% from 45 to 64, and 24.5% who were 65 years of age or older. The median age was 48 years. For every 100 females, there were 94.2 males. For every 100 females age 18 and over, there were 91.5 males.

The median income for a household in the CDP was $95,546, and the median income for a family was $100,240. Males had a median income of $75,518 versus $42,479 for females. The per capita income for the CDP was $43,850. About 0.4% of families and 1.8% of the population were below the poverty line, including 1.3% of those under age 18 and 2.6% of those age 65 or over.

== Schools ==
Hampton is served by these public schools:

=== Elementary schools ===
- Hampton Elementary
- Cromwell Valley Elementary (Magnet)

=== Middle schools ===
- Ridgely Middle School

=== High schools ===
- Loch Raven High School
- Towson High School

Two private schools, Notre Dame Preparatory School, a Catholic school for girls and Concordia Preparatory School, a co-educational Lutheran school are located in Hampton.
