= Nancy Brown (columnist) =

American advice columnist (1870–1948)

- Brown in 1939
- Born: Annie Louise Brown; December 11, 1870; Perry, Maine, US
- Died: October 7, 1948 (aged 77); Detroit, Michigan, US
- Other names: Annie L. Leslie; Mrs. J. E. Leslie
- Occupation: Advice columnist
- Years active: 1917–1942
- Known for: Writing the "Experience" column in The Detroit News

Annie Leslie (born Annie Louise Brown; December 11, 1870 – October 7, 1948) was an American newspaper columnist. She was among the first American advice columnists, writing the column "Experience" for The Detroit News under the pen name Nancy Brown from 1917 to 1942. Her column was very successful and led to the crowdfunding of a series of community projects, including the reforesting of 560 acres (230 ha) of clearcut forest in Northern Michigan during the Great Depression. Beginning in 1934, she hosted an annual sunrise religious gathering at Belle Isle that was called Sunday Service. The gatherings led to a fundraising campaign that resulted in the building of the Nancy Brown Peace Carillon. Brown graduated from Mount Holyoke College, worked for around 10 years as a schoolteacher, and was briefly the Pittsburgh Dispatch's drama editor.

== Early life and education ==
Annie Louise Brown was born on December 11, 1870, (Note: Some sources give 1869 as her year of birth.) in Perry, Maine, to Ann Robinson (née Lincoln) and Levi Prescott Brown, a farmer and Civil War veteran. She went to high school in Middleborough, Massachusetts. She began attending Mount Holyoke College in 1888 and earned her degree in 1892.

== Career ==
Following her graduation from Mount Holyoke, Brown was a schoolteacher for around 10 years, in Rockville, Connecticut, White River Junction, Vermont, and Mount Clemens, Michigan. She married the journalist and editor James Edward Leslie on September 19, 1904. After he died in 1917, she assumed his position as the Pittsburgh Dispatch's drama editor.

Brown then moved to Michigan. She was hired at The Detroit News in 1918, working in the women's department and answering letters sent from readers. Her weekly advice column "Experience", starting in April 1919, became a daily feature within three months. She was among the first advice columnists in the United States, using the nom de plume "Nancy Brown". She later used "Mrs. J. E. Leslie", her married name. In her column, she fielded a wide variety of questions from readers, addressing social and moral issues, financial concerns, marital problems, grief, and unemployment. The readers were given pseudonyms and wrote in with questions about no-budget weddings, canning dandelion greens, and hairstyles. Her column became immensely popular and she was praised for her sincerity and a "homey, frank style that was gentle, yet firm." The readership came to be known as the "Experience Column Family".

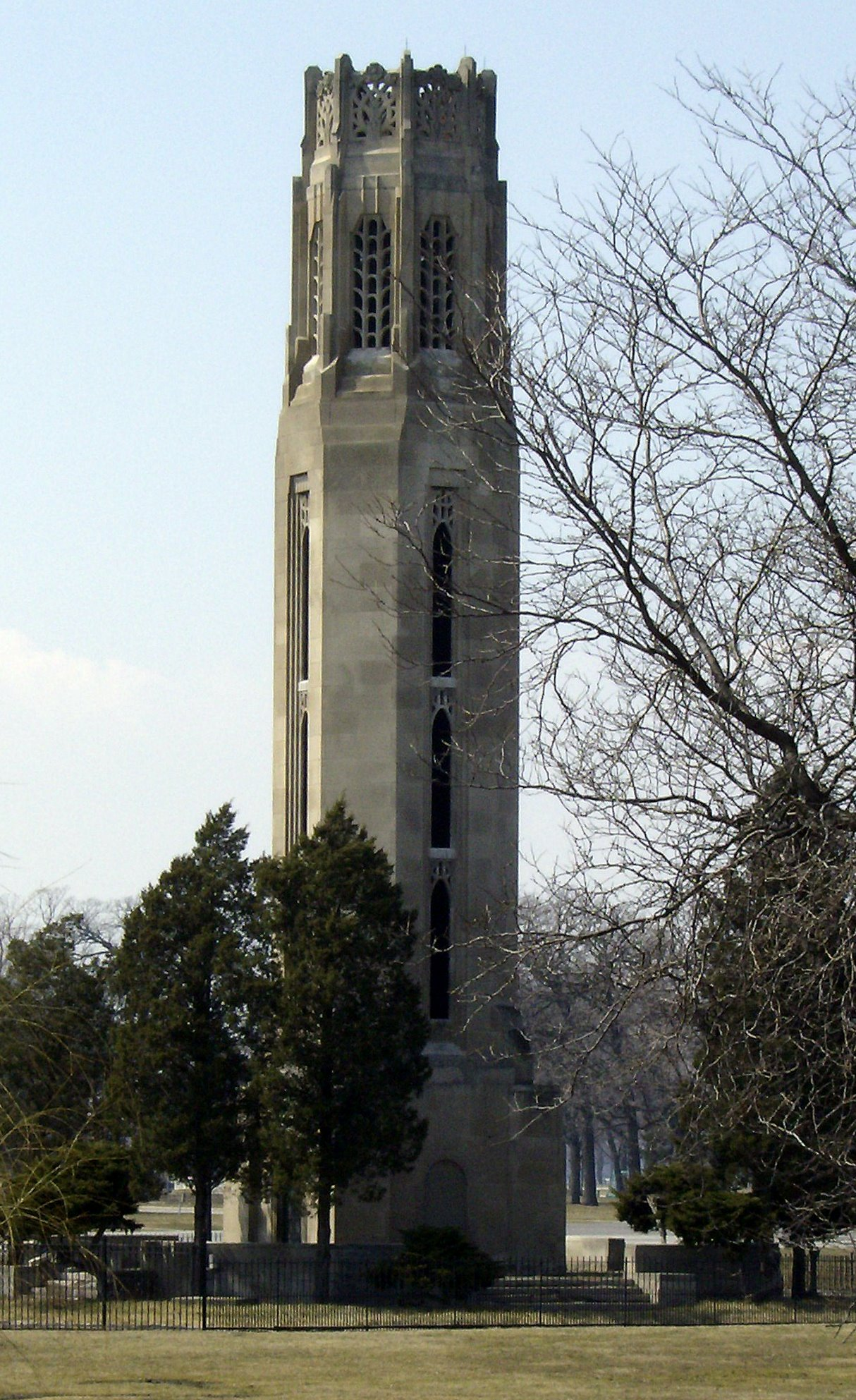
The Nancy Brown Peace Carillon on Belle Isle

Brown used her column to crowdfund a series of community projects. A 1929 campaign to reforest 560 acres (230 ha) of clearcut forest in Northern Michigan was funded largely by the "Experience" readership after Brown published a letter suggesting that readers make donations. She encouraged her readership to engage with modern art; over 30,000 people attended a party at the Detroit Institute of Arts for the column's readers. A fundraising campaign that lasted several years was used to purchase artwork for the institute's collection, including a painting of Henry Wadsworth Longfellow by Rembrandt Peale. The unveiling of one artwork was attended by 11,000 people and described as "the greatest party Detroit ever had." A concert series by the Detroit Symphony Orchestra was also organized by the Experience Column Family.

Brown started an annual sunrise religious gathering at Belle Isle in 1934 that was called Sunday Service. Crowds for the gatherings numbered in the tens of thousands. In 1936, a campaign began to construct a carillon where the Sunday Service gatherings were held as a monument to peace. Over 60,000 people donated $59,000 (the equivalent of over $1,000,000 in 2023) towards the construction of the tower. The groundbreaking ceremony that was held for the Nancy Brown Peace Carillon was estimated by the Detroit police to have attracted 100,000 attendees. Construction was completed in 1940.

Brown tended to be conservative in her viewpoints, upholding the institution of marriage. Responding to the subject of a teenage girl and kissing, she wrote that "the right kind of girl does not allow promiscuous kissing. The right kind of girl, with a clean, little girl mind, such as she should have at that age is not always thinking of kissing." In American Women Writers, Ann Pringle Eliasberg observed that the style of Brown's columns resembled the prose used in the readers' letters, writing that "one feels that Leslie selected letters carefully and put them through extensive and thorough editorial processing." Brown wrote in 1921 that "the principal appeal of the [advice] column is the love that we all have to talk about ourselves and the human desire to unburden our troubles."

Brown continued writing the column and did not reveal her identity to the public until 1940. Her final column was published on January 8, 1942.

Brown became ill and was hospitalized in July 1948. She died on October 7, 1948, in Detroit, Michigan. She is buried at Oakview Cemetery in Royal Oak.

Brown's collected columns were published in eight books by The Detroit News, beginning in 1932. The Annie Louise "Nancy" Brown Papers are held in the Mount Holyoke College Archives and Special Collections Repository.
