= Tire rotation =

Changing the position of tires to ensure even wear

Tire rotation methods

Rear wheels to front

Rear to front, left to right

Tire rotation is the practice of moving the wheels and tires of an automobile from one position to another, to ensure even tire wear. Even tire wear extends the useful life of a set of tires, but the value of this is disputed.

== Causes of uneven tire wear ==
The differing weight placed on the tires by the front and rear axles causes uneven wear. With the majority of cars having the engine in front, the front tires typically bear more weight than the rear tires. Front-wheel drive vehicles have not only the engine but also the transaxle in front, adding to the weight difference. Moreover, additional stress is placed disproportionately on the front tires by braking and steering. Thus, tire rotation needs to occur more frequently for front-wheel drive vehicles.

Turning the vehicle will cause uneven tire wear. The outside, front tire is worn disproportionately. In countries with right-hand traffic, for example, right turns are tighter than left turns and most cloverleaf interchanges and parking ramps are right-hand curves, so the left front tire wears faster than the right front, because the left tire travels a greater distance around those turns (the same way that an athlete in the leftmost lane would have to run further around an oval track than one in the rightmost if the race were being run clockwise from a flat line start) and a majority of turns will be to the right. Conversely, the sidewalls on the right tire tends to be bumped and rubbed against the curb while parking the vehicle, causing asymmetric sidewall wear. The symmetric opposite occurs in countries that drive on the left.

In addition, mechanical problems in the vehicle may cause uneven tire wear. Wheels misaligned with each other and/or with the vehicle's axis will tend to be dragged along by the other wheels, causing uneven wear in that tire. If the alignment is such that the vehicle tends to turn, the driver will correct by steering against the tendency. In effect the vehicle is constantly turning, causing uneven tire wear.

== Tire rotation practice ==
Car and tire manufacturers may recommend tire rotation frequency and pattern, typically every 5,000 mi (≈8,000 km) to 8,000 mi (≈13,000 km) depending on the tire manufacturer and vehicle make to ensure even tire wear.

A common rotation pattern is to move the back wheels to the front, and the front to the back but crossing them when moving to the back. If the tires are unidirectional, the rotation can only be rotated front to back on the same side of the vehicle to preserve the rotational direction of the tires, unless they are remounted.

More complex rotation patterns are required if the vehicle has a full-size spare tire that is part of the rotation, or if there are snow tires.

== Alternative views ==
The benefits of achieving even tire wear, using rotation, are disputed. Some car manufacturers recommend against performing tire rotation, for example BMW. Many tire manufacturers say that tire rotation is no longer necessary, except to ensure that best tires are fitted at the rear of the vehicle. In practice this means that when the front tires become worn, the new ones should be fitted to the rear, moving the old rear tires to the front.

Best tires on rear of vehicle

Maximum vehicle control is achieved with the best tires on the rear wheels of the vehicle, whether it is front- or rear-wheel drive. The reason for this is that if the rear wheels lose grip before the front ones, an oversteer condition will occur, which is harder to control than the corresponding understeer which will happen if a front wheel is lost. So the intuitive belief that the front steering/driving tires need to be the best quality is not the case.

This is also the case if a tire blows out. A rear tire blowout will cause the vehicle to become very difficult to control, especially at highway speeds. It also greatly increases the risk of rollover due to yawing, a condition where the rear of the vehicle swings out and becomes perpendicular to the direction of travel: yawing can cause the tire to separate from the rim, leading the rim to dig into the pavement, or dirt and grass if no longer on the road, which can trip the vehicle and cause its rollover.
