= Tire Rack =

American tire and wheels distributor

- Type: Privately held
- Industry: Automotive
- Founded: 1979; 47 years ago
- Founder: Peter Veldman
- Fate: Acquired by Discount Tire
- Headquarters: South Bend, Indiana, U.S.
- Area served: United States, Canada
- Key people: Peter Veldman, Founder and President (1979–2014); Mike Joines, Executive Chairman (2014–present) Scott Clark, CEO (2025–present)
- Products: Tires, wheels, auto accessories
- Services: Tire testing & reviews, mobile tire installation
- Number of employees: 400+
- Website: tirerack.com

Tire Rack is an American automotive tire, wheel, and accessories retailer, publisher of tire tests, and wholesale tire distributor headquartered in South Bend, Indiana.

== History ==
In 1979, automotive parts and service business owner Peter "Pete" Veldman came up with his business idea for the Tire Rack after his son-in-law Mike Joines was frustrated when he couldn't find tires for his Opel Manta sports coupe. Mike recommended that they start a mail-order tire company that stocked a few of every tire. Although Pete convinced Mike to help him open a retail store instead, they had so many phone orders that they eventually shut down the retail location and opened more phone lines. Three years after opening the store, Tire Rack got into the mail order business and by 1990 the store was shut down.

In 1995, Tire Rack began its website where it posted reviews of tires it sold. In 1998, Tire Rack began online sales.

By 2005, Tire Rack had grown into a nationwide company that distributes more than 2 million tires annually. As of 2017, the company offers 24 tire brands and has ten warehouses in nine states. Customers who pick up orders from a warehouse location are offered a discount. After 26 years of being a privately owned family company, Los Angeles-based investment group Leonard Green & Partners purchased a 49% stake in the company with the Veldman family controlling the majority 51%.

Pete Veldman died on March 14, 2014, at the age of 87. Pete's son-in-law Mike Joines succeeded him as president.

On December 4, 2021, Discount Tire acquired Tire Rack for an undisclosed amount.

Tire Rack became Rivian’s recommended third party tire replacement company of reference in 2024.

In April 2025, Tire Rack appointed Scott Clark—a 29-year tire industry veteran and former CEO of Michelin North America, where he oversaw Michelin’s two-wheel, car, and motorsports tire businesses—as its new CEO. Mike Joines will continue to have a leadership role with the company, transitioning to the role of executive chairman, with a focus on strategies that will help expand and accelerate the growth of the business.

== Motorsports and marketing ==
Since 1995, Tire Rack has been the title sponsor of the National Sports Car Club of America (SCCA) Solo Program, a club that allows driving enthusiasts to compete at a local level.

Tire Rack sponsors Team Penske drivers Josef Newgarden (#2) and Scott McLaughlin (#3) in the NTT INDYCAR SERIES. The sponsorship was part of Team Penske’s 2023 and 2024 Indianapolis 500 victories, with Newgarden securing both wins. These wins marked the team’s 20th and second consecutive victories in the event.

In 2025, Tire Rack and WeatherTech Raceway Laguna Seca announced a multi-year sponsorship agreement that includes the naming rights of the raceway’s iconic “Tire Bridge” between Turns 3 and 4, and title sponsorship of the IMSA TireRack.com Monterey Sportscar Championship weekend, held May 9–11, 2025.
