= BMW Car Club of America =

American automobile enthusiast organization

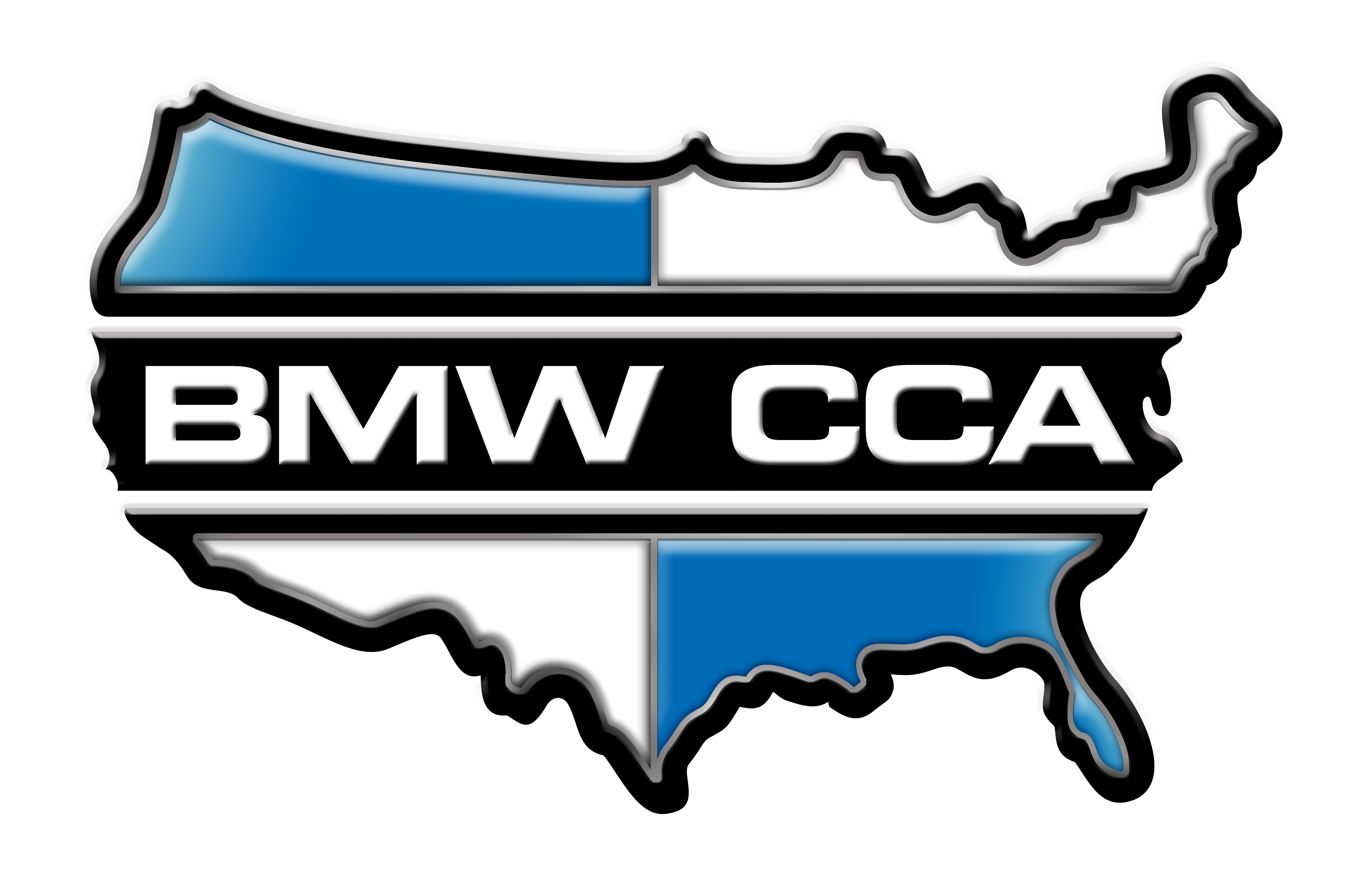
The BMW CCA Logo

The BMW Car Club of America (BMW CCA) is a U.S.-based organization of enthusiasts and owners of BMW-made automobiles (including MINI). Organized into five regions and 69 chapters, the club has more than 75,000 active members within the United States, making it the largest BMW owner/enthusiast organization in the world. The BMW CCA arranges a wide variety of social, technical and driving events, including autocross, high-performance driver's education, rallies, club racing and owner education on topics such as mechanical repair, automotive maintenance and collecting vintage vehicles.

== History and structure ==
Founded in Boston in 1969, the organization began as an owner-support network, the club exists as a separate entity from BMW AG and its North American subsidiary, although there is a close working relationship, such as discounts on vehicles and parts provided to club members by the company. Currently headquartered at 2350 Highway 101 South Greer, SC, the BMW CCA is a not-for-profit corporation, governed by an elected board of directors that meets quarterly. Five Regional Vice Presidents, who serve on the board, represent the interests of the chapters. Each chapter is an independent corporation chartered by BMW CCA and operates within with minimum standards of service to the membership. All chapters are geographically based except for the E30 and E31 Chapters, which are non-geographic model-specific chapters.

=== Past Locations ===
- PO Box 99 at the Prudential Center, Boston MA (Jul 1969)
- 2 Brewer Street, Cambridge, MA (Dec 1974)
- 345 Harvard Street, Cambridge, MA (Jul 1978)
- 640 South Main Street, Suite 201 Greenville, SC (2001)

=== BMW CCA Foundation ===
In March 2002, the BMW CCA formed the 501(c)(3) BMW CCA Foundation. This charity is dedicated to preserving the history of the BMW marque in the U.S., the club's history and to fund and operates a Teen Driver Safety School Program, known as Street Survival. The Foundation operates a car museum and archive building adjacent to the BMW Manufacturing Plant and BMW Performance Center in Greer, South Carolina.

The Street Survival program is aimed at teaching young American drivers, age 15-21 the importance of safe driving through emergency and accident avoidance training conducted in their own cars by qualified volunteers and professionals. Since 2002, over 1000 Street Survival Schools have been conducted in the United States and Canada.

== Publications ==
=== Roundel ===
Roundel is the club's national, monthly magazine. More akin to mainstream automotive periodicals than a newsletter, Roundel covers the history of the BMW marque, reviews current models and trends, offers articles on vehicle modification and maintenance, coverage of the organization's club races and columns by notable authors, racing drivers and club officials. Local BMW CCA chapters publish newsletters to inform members about upcoming events.

=== BimmerLife ===
BimmerLife is the BMW CCA's public-facing online news site, sharing stories about the BMW community. BimmerLife covers BMW news, motorsports, events (both CCA and non-CCA) as well as general interest articles from the BMW community as a whole. While some content is user submitted, BimmerLife also has recurring articles from columnists such as The Hack Mechanic: Rob Siegel.

== National programs ==
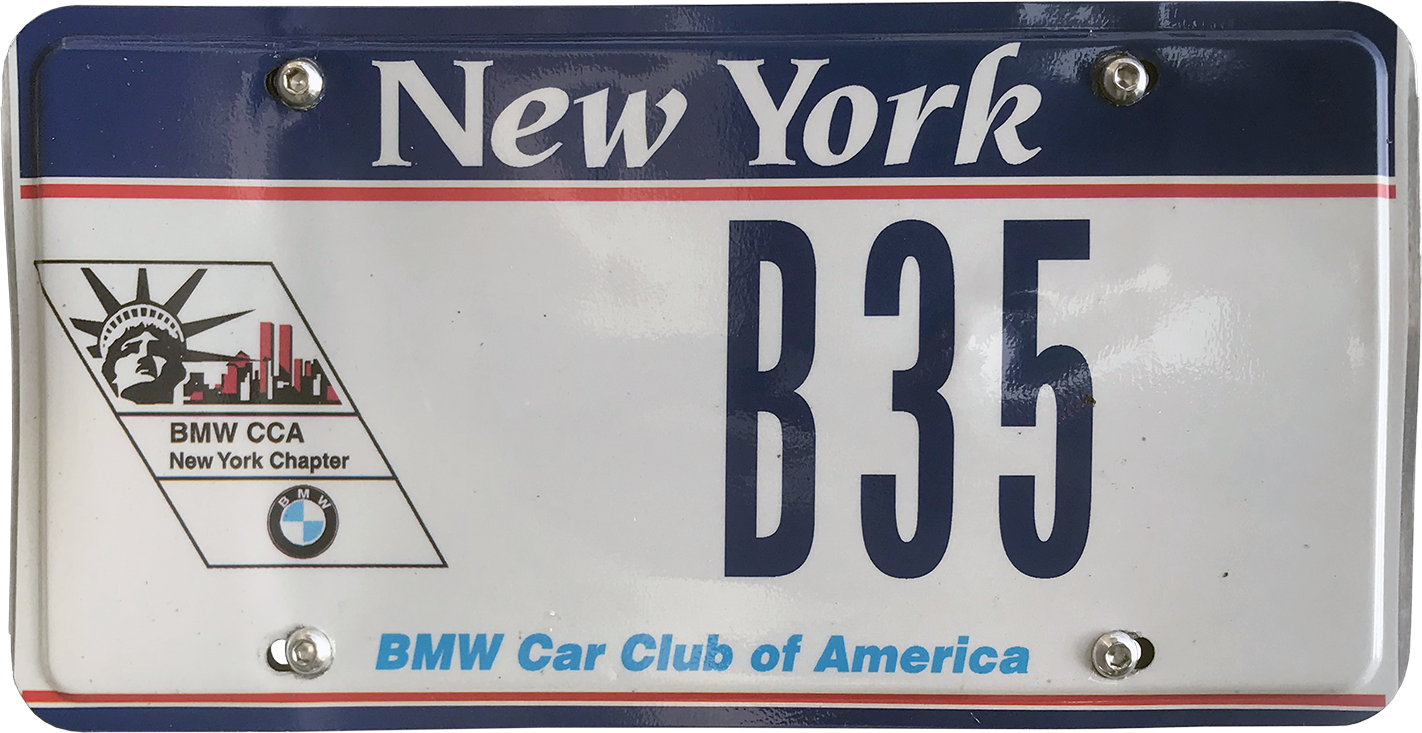
BMW CCA license plate, issued in New York State

=== Oktoberfest ===
Each year the club hosts a week-long event, Oktoberfest, a national club gathering, that includes non-speed competitive driving events, a wide variety of technical sessions, vendor displays and presentations, as well as plenty of socializing with fellow BMW enthusiasts.

The first BMW CCA Oktoberfest was held in 1970 in Concord, Massachusetts. Since then, the annual gathering of the Club has been held every year. Here are the Oktoberfest locations and the years:

- 1970 Concord, MA
- 1971 Washington, DC (New Carrollton, MD)
- 1972 Virginia Beach, VA
- 1973 Atlantic City, NJ
- 1974 Waterbury, CT
- 1975 Alpine Valley, WI
- 1976 Washington, DC (Silver Spring, MD)
- 1977 San Mateo, CA
- 1978 Oconomowoc WI
- 1979 Danvers, MA
- 1980 San Diego, CA
- 1981 Milwaukee, WI
- 1982 Albany, NY
- 1983 Colorado Springs, CO
- 1984 Sturbridge, MA
- 1985 Monterey, CA
- 1986 Orlando, FL
- 1987 Tulsa, OK
- 1988 Rochester, NY
- 1989 Keystone, CO
- 1990 Columbus, OH
- 1991 Waterbury, CT
- 1992 West Palm Beach, FL
- 1993 Sonoma Valley, CA
- 1994 Andover, MA
- 1995 Breckinridge, CO
- 1996 Tysons Corner, VA
- 1997 Waterville Valley, NH
- 1998 Orlando, FL
- 1999 Indianapolis, IN
- 2000 Spartanburg, SC
- 2001 Waterville Valley, NH
- 2002 Keystone, CO
- 2003 Austin, TX
- 2004 Pasadena, CA
- 2005 Greensboro, NC
- 2006 Grand Rapids, MI
- 2007 Fort Worth, TX
- 2008 Watkins Glen, NY
- 2009 Lake Lanier, GA
- 2010 Elkhart Lake, WI
- 2011 Birmingham, AL
- 2012 Columbus, OH
- 2013 Monterey, CA
- 2014 Beaver Creek, CO
- 2015 Absecon, NJ
- 2016 Monterey, CA
- 2017 New Orleans, LA
- 2018 Pittsburgh, PA
- 2019 Greenville, SC

=== BMW CCA Club Racing ===
The BMW CCA organizes and oversees the BMW CCA Club Racing series, one of the largest single-marque amateur racing series in the United States. Begun in 1995, BMW CCA Club Racing has grown to nearly 50 races annually, organized by region, with more than a dozen classes for different models and levels of modification.

=== Techfest ===
Techfest is not currently an active program. The BMW CCA Techfest was a national three- to four-day gathering of Club members and BMW technical experts and vendors. Techfest presented lectures, panels, and technical instruction workshops aimed at informing BMW owners on advanced repair and maintenance techniques, and also provided a forum for independent service providers and aftermarket vendors to show off their wares and services. Techfest 2003 was held in the Los Angeles, California area. Techfest 2004 was in Reston, Virginia. There was no event in 2005. In 2006, Techfest was hosted in St. Louis, Missouri. The last Techfest was held in 2007 in Tacoma, Washington.

Techfest was the successor to the long-running Gateway Tech, which was held annually by the Saint Louis BMW Club, a BMW CCA chapter, starting in 1982. Although it was presented by the St. Louis chapter and staffed mostly by volunteers from that chapter, and remained a chapter event, Gateway Tech eventually became sanctioned as a regional event by BMW CCA. Gateway Tech was always held in the St. Louis, Missouri area, but attendees came from all over the United States. The last Gateway Tech under that name was held in 2002. For 2006, Gateway Tech's successor event, Techfest, returned the gathering to its roots in St. Louis, Missouri.
