= Roundel (magazine) =

The cover of the September 2007 issue of Roundel, featuring the BMW E92 M3 coupé.

Roundel is a periodical that serves as the newsletter of the BMW Car Club of America. They review new cars as well as perform comparison tests. There is a classified ads section which has a large selection of BMWs.

== Overview ==
The headquarters of Roundel was first in Cambridge, Massachusetts. Later it was moved to in Greer, South Carolina. The magazine presumably takes its name from the fact that the BMW logo is a roundel.

In 2020, the magazine was renamed BMW Car Club Magazine: Roundel, and is published ten times a year. It is joined biannually by BMW Car Club Magazine: BimmerLife.

== See also ==
- Car Design News
