= Wheel alignment =

Adjustment of the angles of wheels on a car

Wheel alignment, sometimes referred to as wheel tracking, is a vehicle maintenance procedure involving adjustment of the geometric angles of a vehicle’s wheels. Proper alignment helps prevent abnormal tire wear and assists in maintaining stable vehicle handling and straight-line travel without pulling to one side.

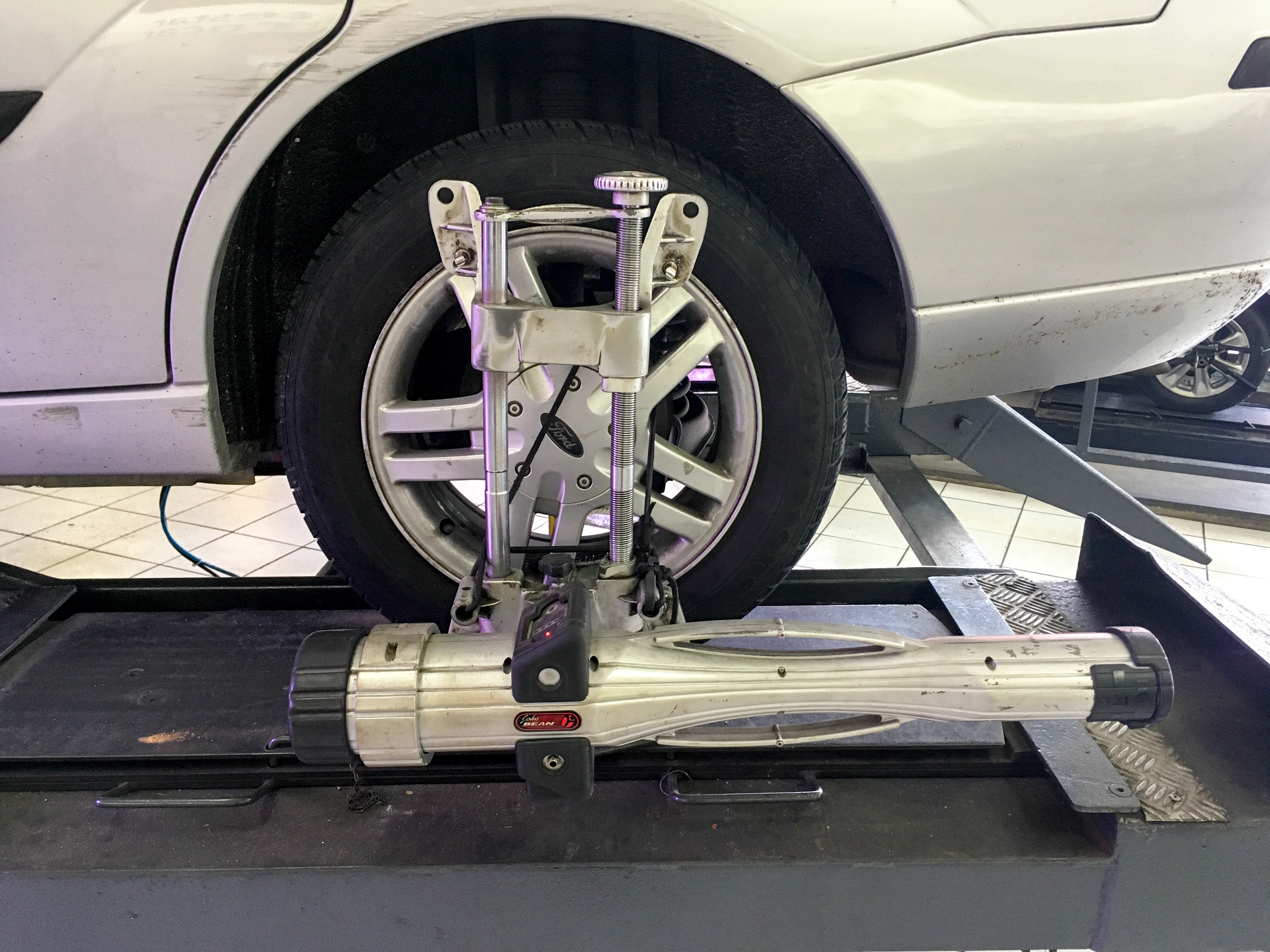
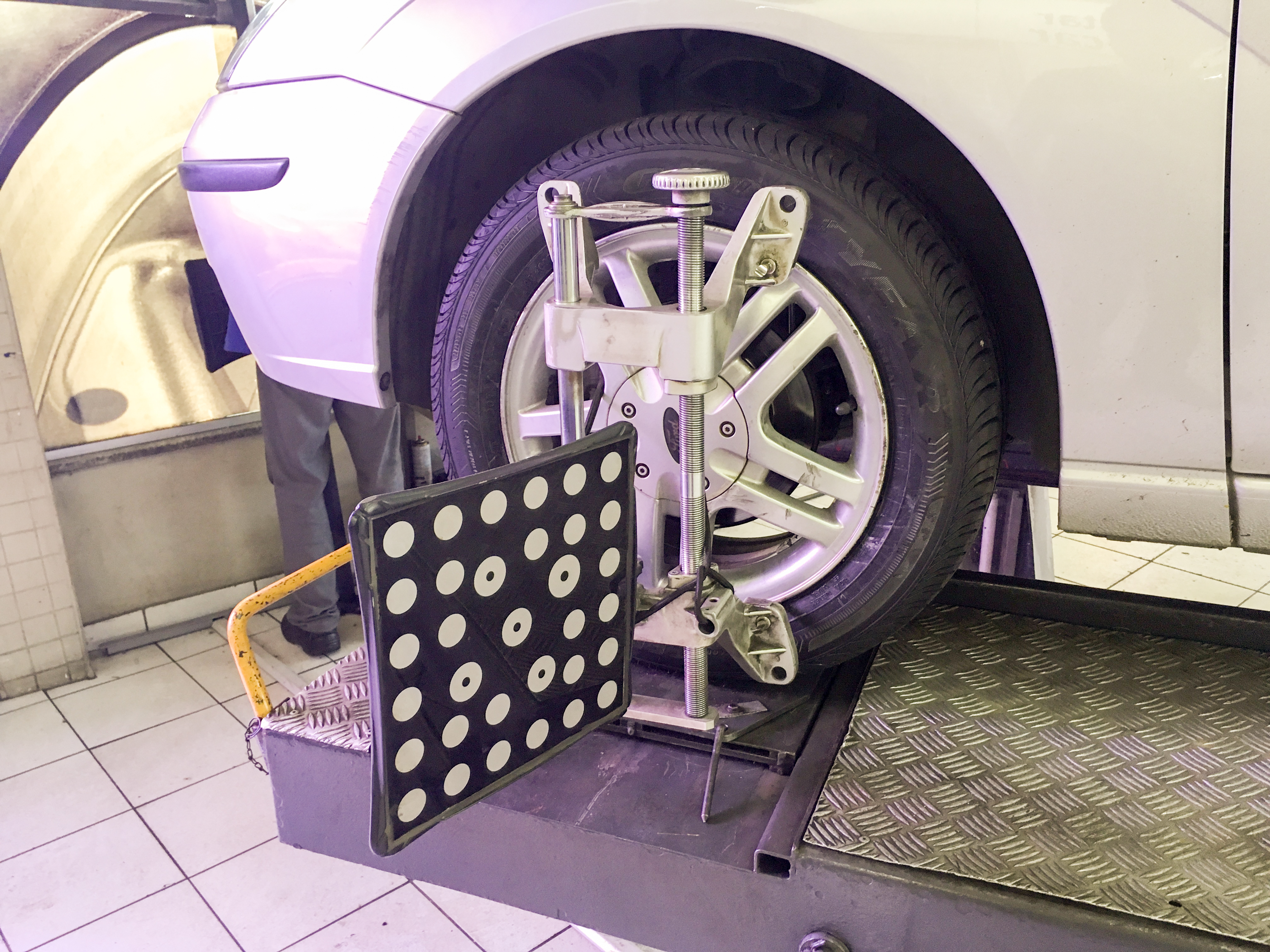
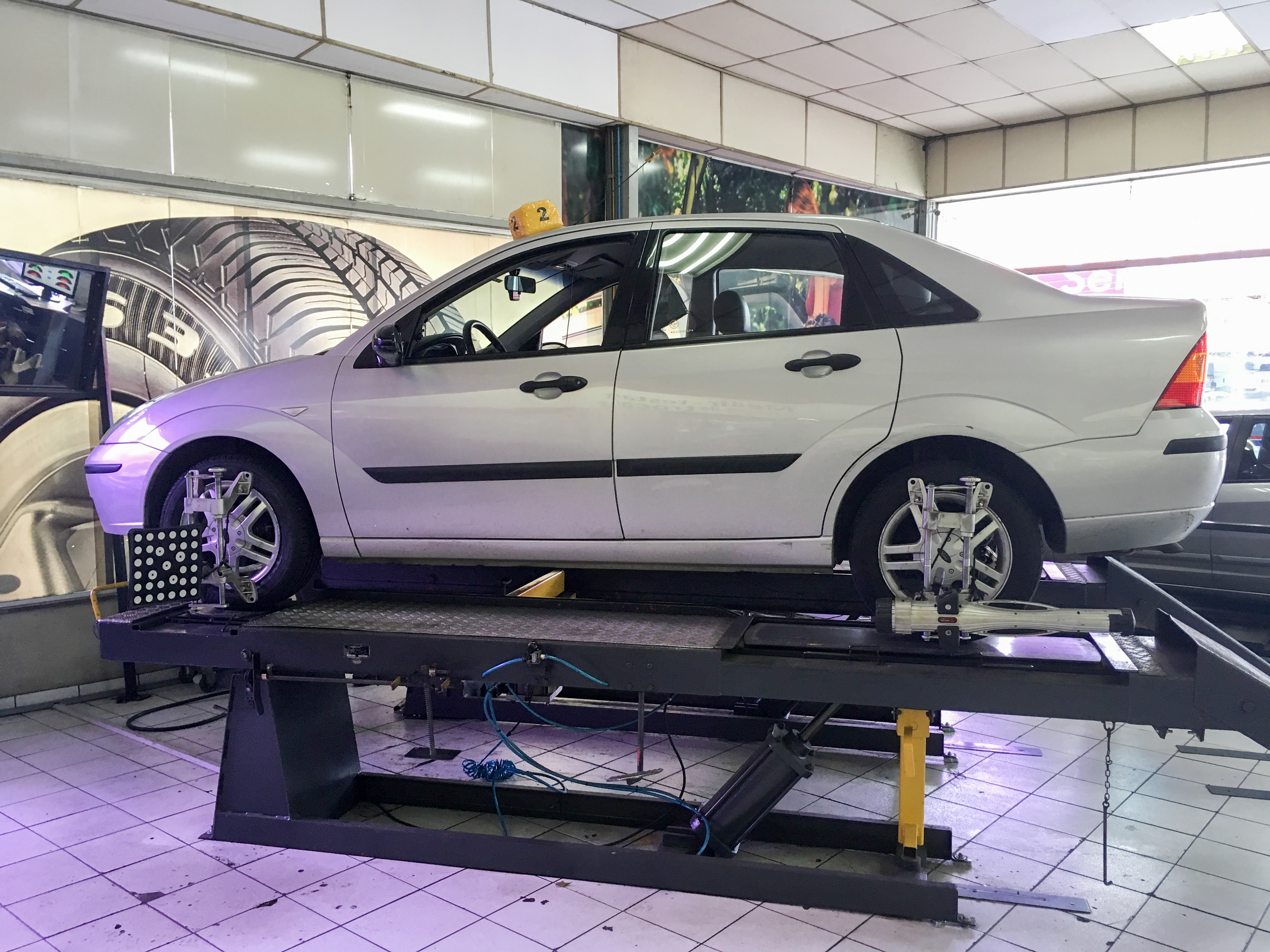
Wheel alignment of a Ford Focus.

In some specialized applications, such as motorsport or off-road use, wheel alignment angles may be intentionally adjusted outside manufacturer specifications to obtain particular handling characteristics.

== Primary angles ==
The primary angles are the basic angle alignment of the wheels relative to each other and to the car body. These adjustments are the camber, caster and toe. On some cars, not all of these can be adjusted on every wheel.

These three parameters can be further categorized into front and rear (with no caster on the rear, typically not being steered wheels). In summary, the parameters are:

- Front: Caster (left & right)
- Front: Camber (left & right)
- Front: Toe (left, right & total)
- Rear: Camber (left & right)
- Rear: Toe (left, right & total)

== Measurement ==
During Vehicle inspection, manufacturers may require that these alignment angles remain within specified tolerances.

Modern wheel alignment monitoring systems use embedded sensors to measure vehicle or wheel orientation and motion characteristics, and software processes this data to estimate wheel alignment conditions and detect misalignment.

== See also ==
- Auto mechanic
- ASE
- Car handling
- Car maintenance
- Tire balance
- Tire rotation
