= Electronic carillon =

Musical instrument

Electronic carillon is a blanket term used to refer to an automated system which imitates the sound of a carillon. These systems simulate and amplify bell sounds which are then played from loudspeakers housed in a bell tower.

Due to the costs associated with installing, maintaining, and operating traditional carillons, many churches and universities now use these types of systems.

== Bell Sound Emulation ==
While a traditional carillon uses actual bells, electronic systems simulate a bell sound in several ways

- By striking semantra (rectangular metal bars roughly the diameter of a pencil, but of varying lengths) with an electric solenoid.
- By striking tubular bells similarly
- By playing back a previously recorded bell sound
- By striking a small number of actual bells in combination with the methods above

== Operation ==
Electronic carillons use internal electronic clocks to determine when chimes or music will be played. The Westminster Quarters are commonly programmed to chime the hour and its divisions, along with musical selections. The musical score is stored on media which can typically be changed or expanded.

Systems may also provide a keyboard or console. This allows a musician to operate the instrument in a manner similar to the way a traditional carillon is operated. These keyboards are sometimes integrated with or attached to an organist's console.

Early automated carillons used electric timers that simply played selected bell strikes or tunes. Modern computerized carillons can be programmed to play selections for Easter, as well as other fixed and movable holidays.

Since these systems use an amplifiers and loudspeakers, many are being expanded to also provide emergency notification systems to college campuses.
