= Outline of tires =

Overview of and topical guide to tires

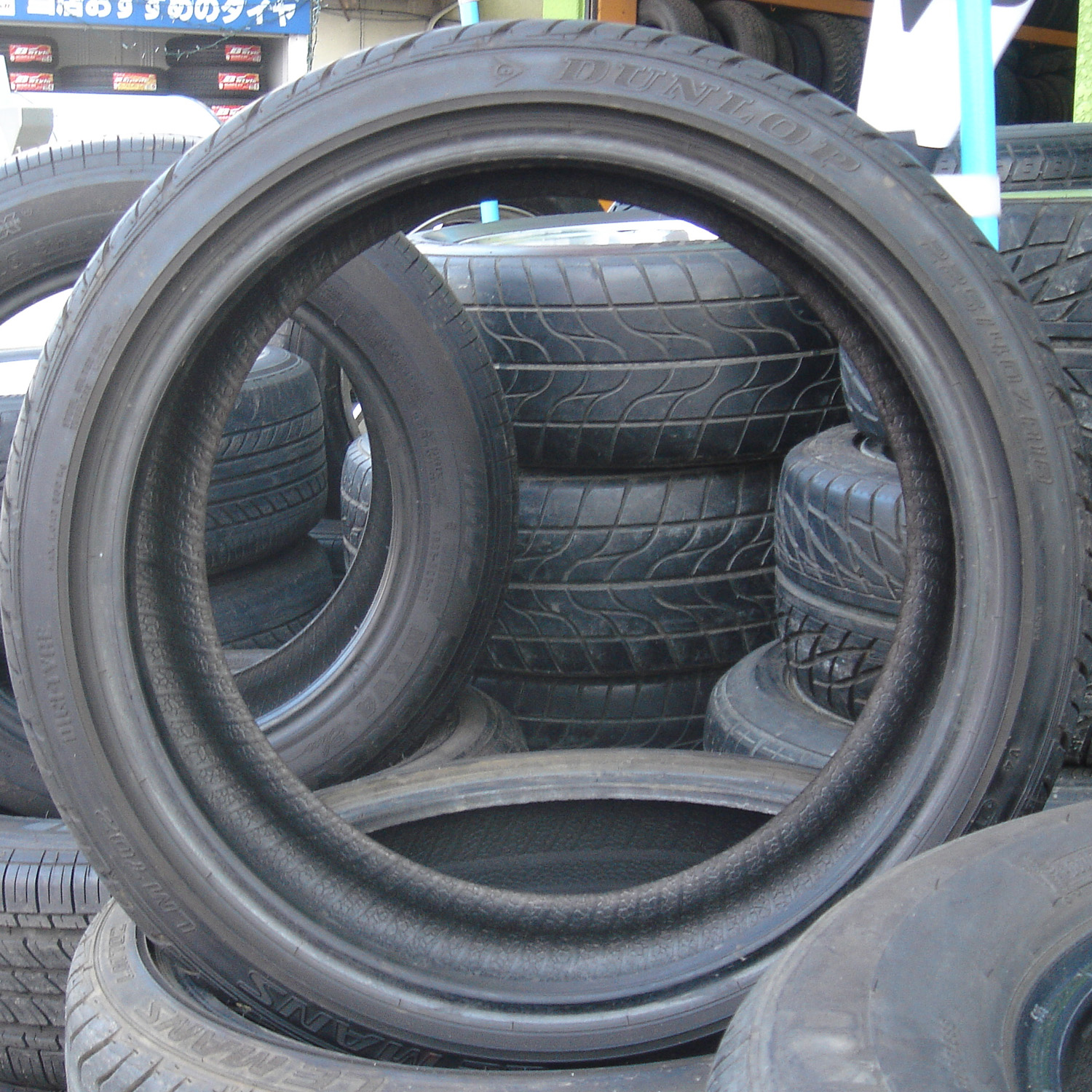
Automobile tires

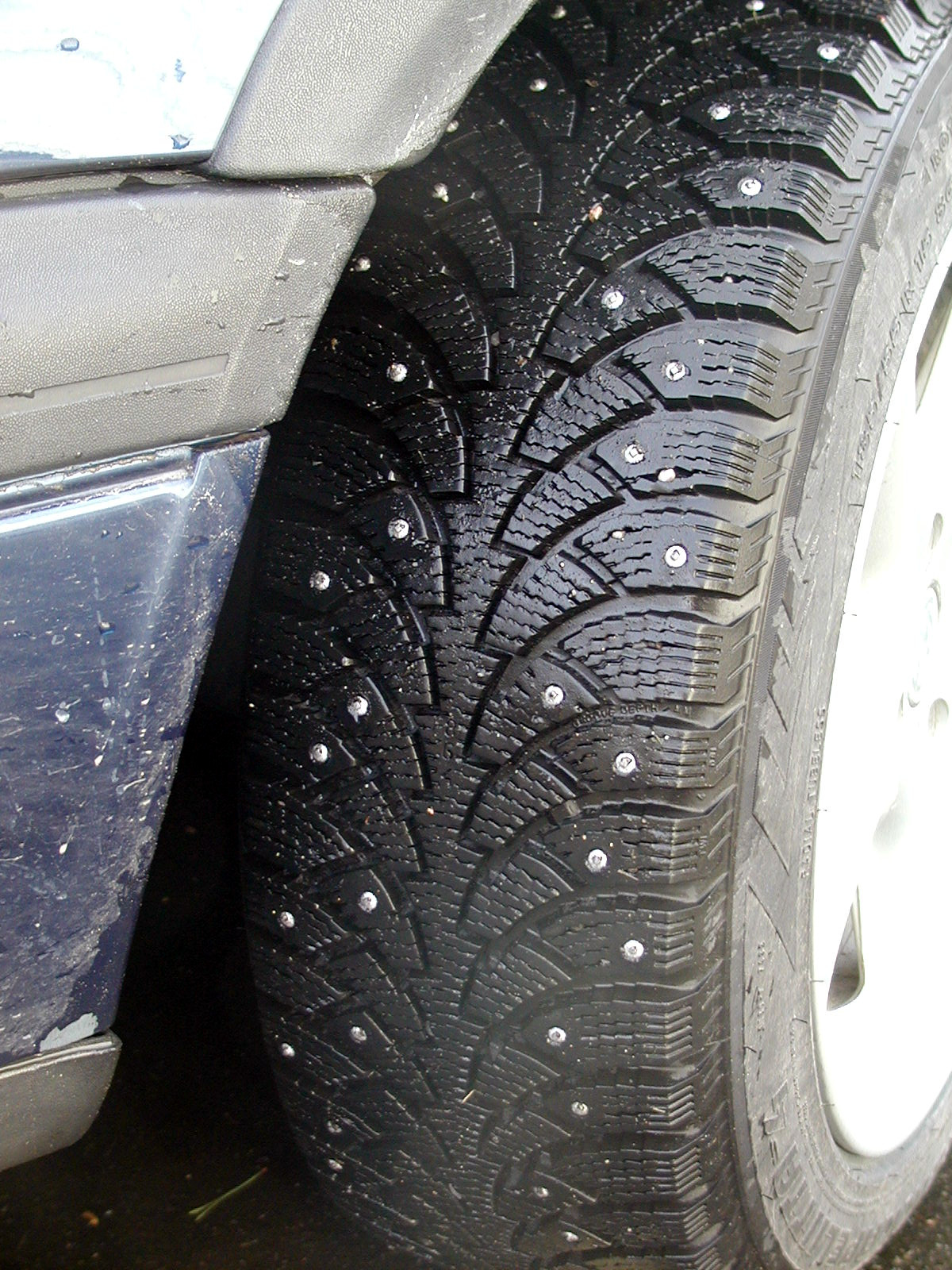
Studded winter tire

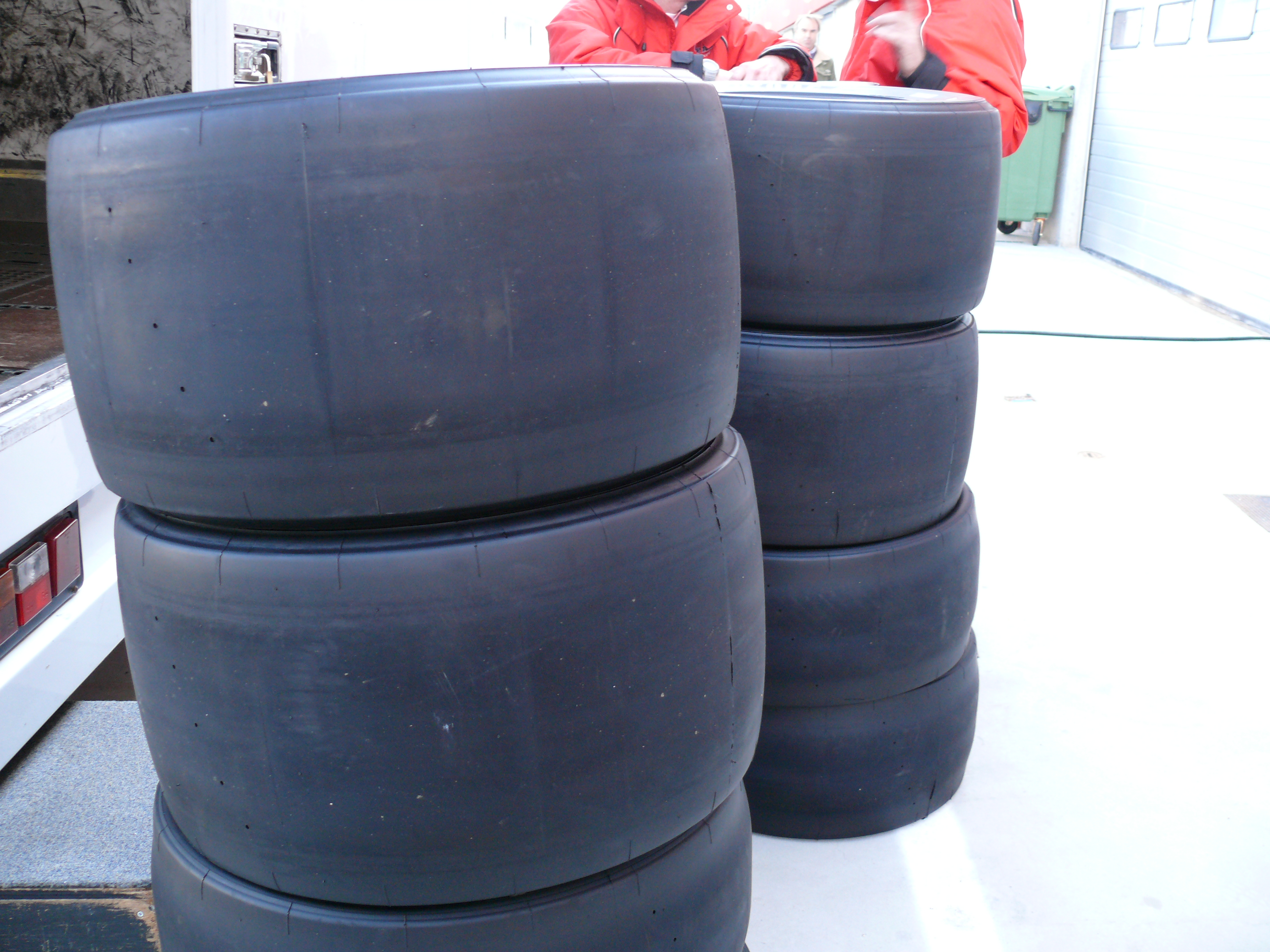
Formula One racing slicks

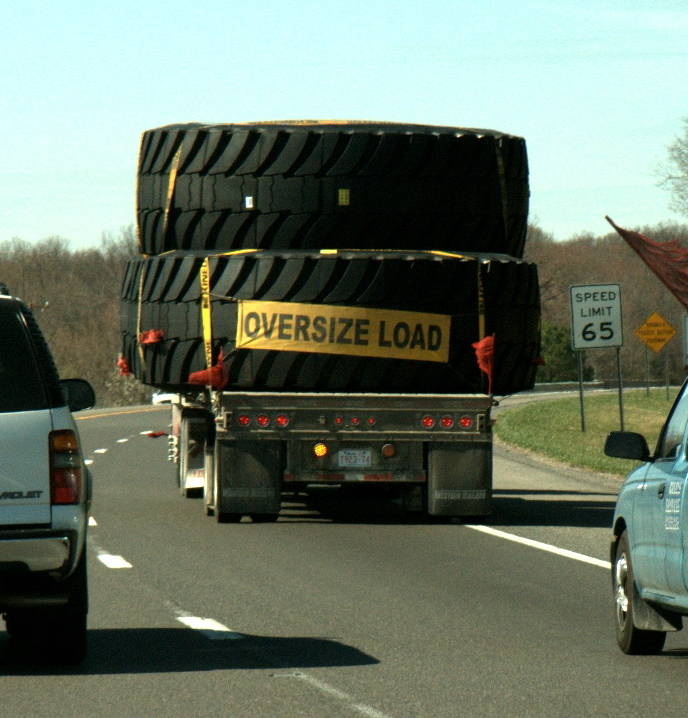
Large tires

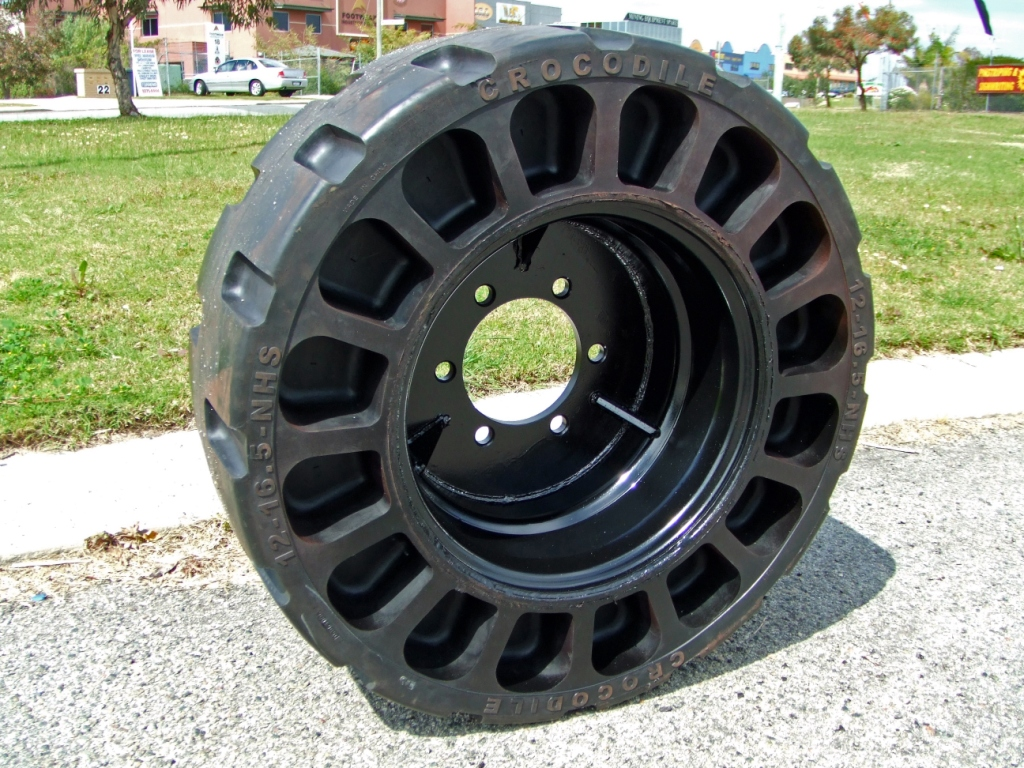
Airless tires

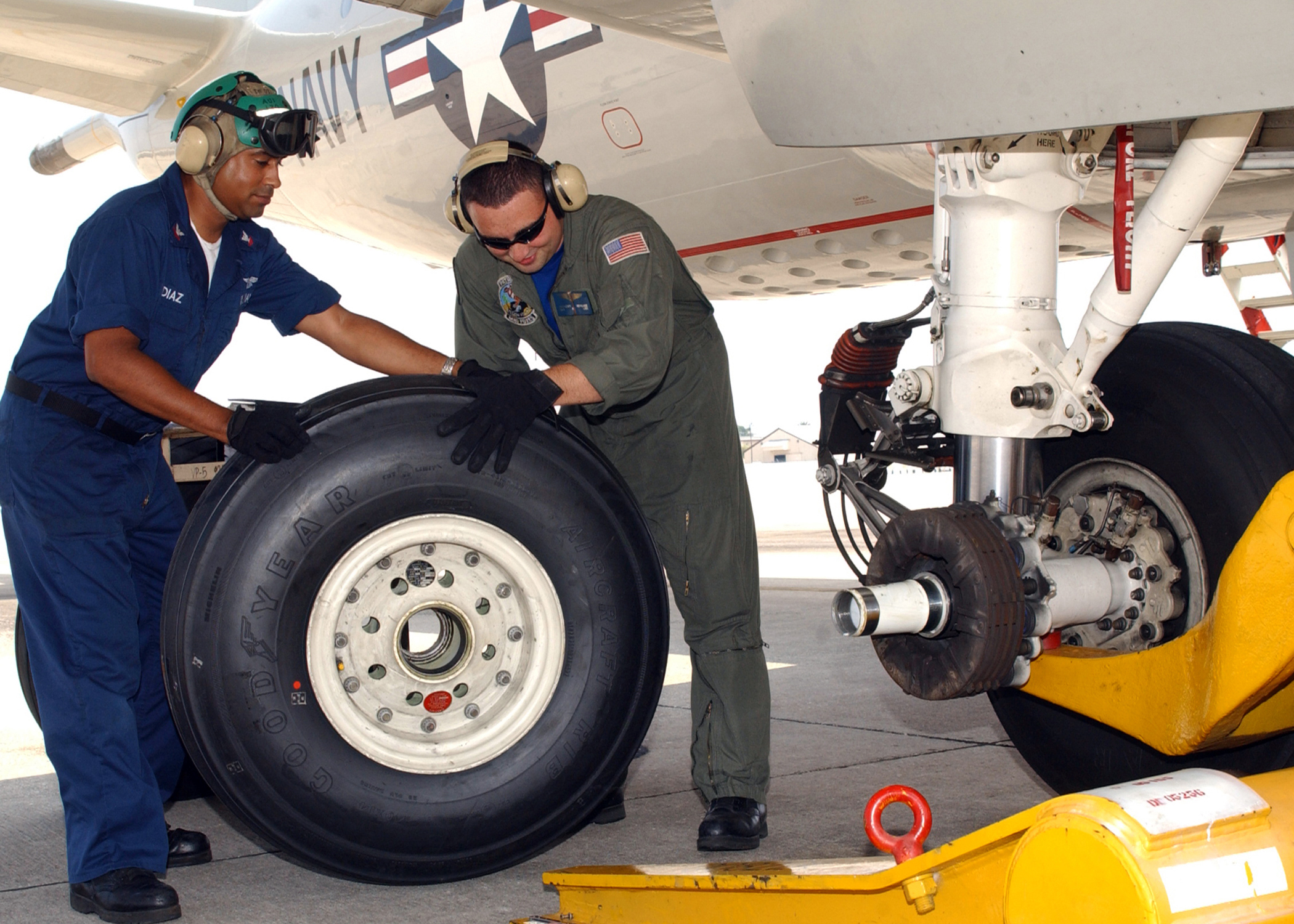
Aircraft tire

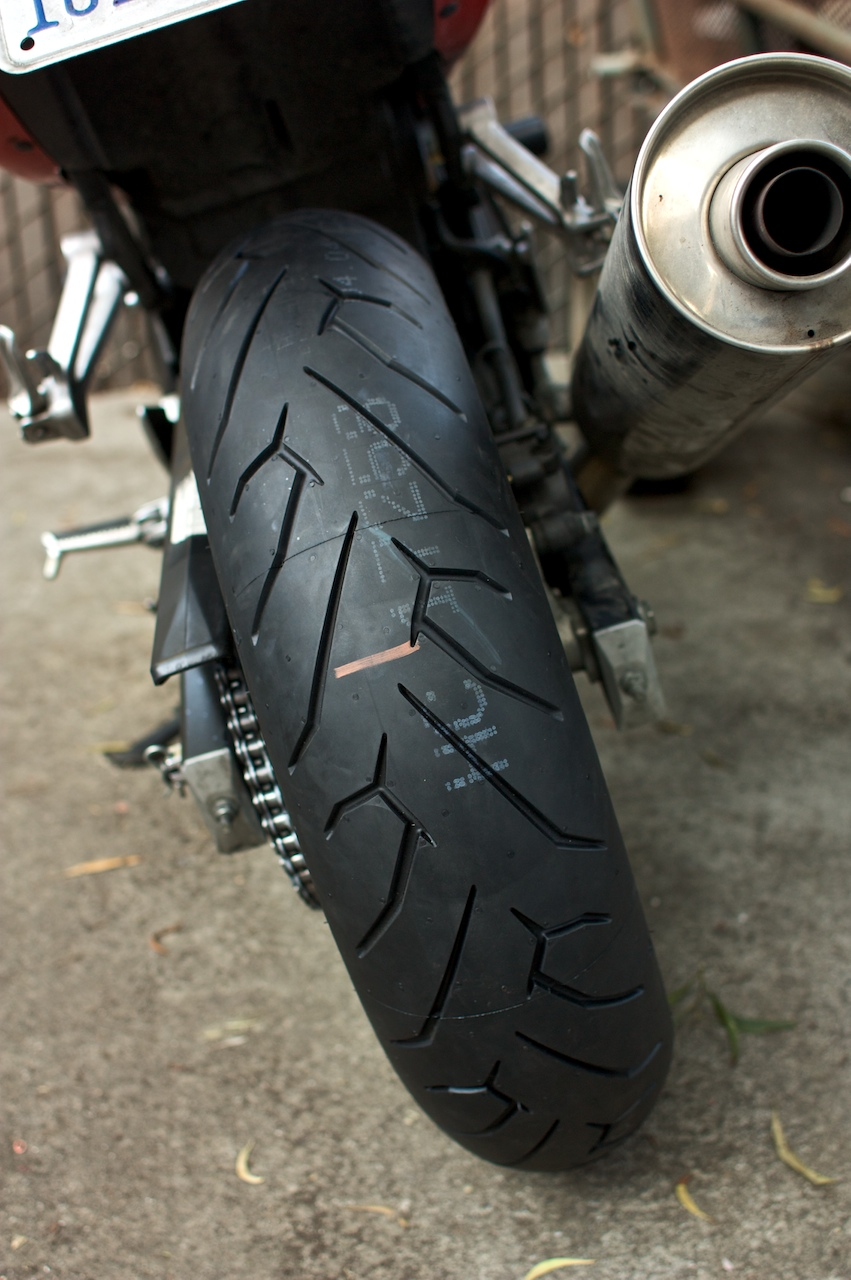
Motorcycle tire

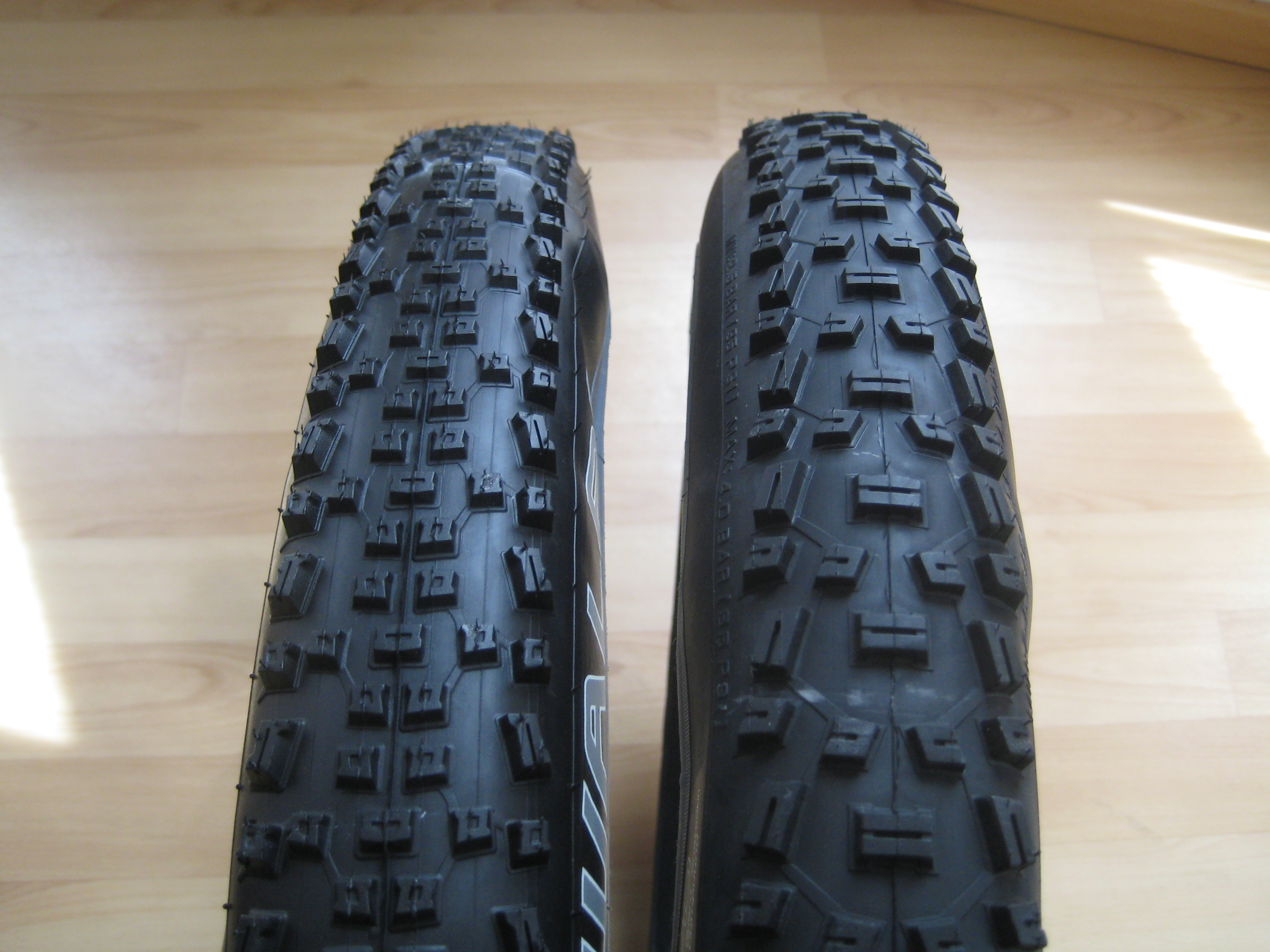
Mountain bike tires

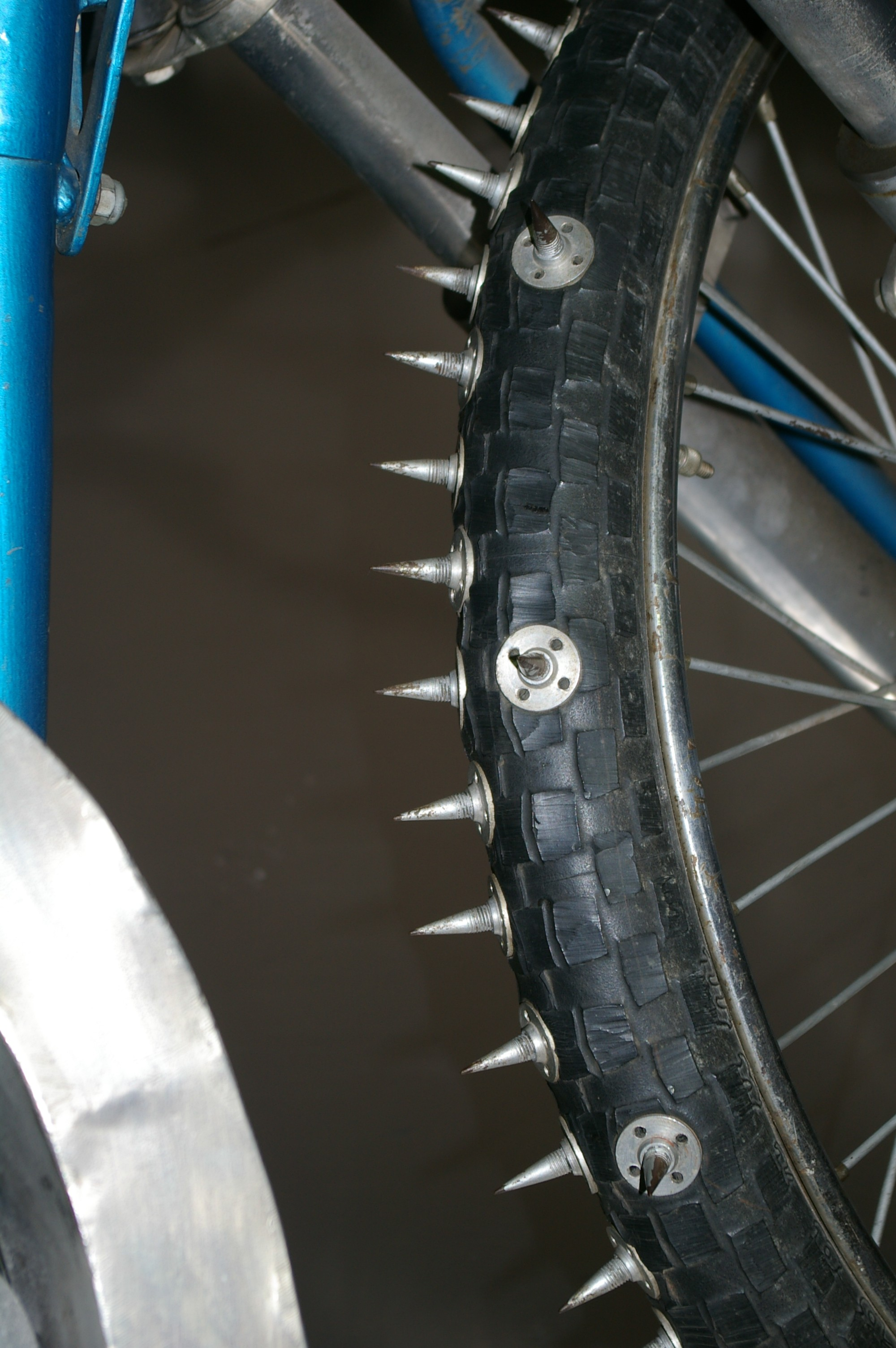
Spiked tire

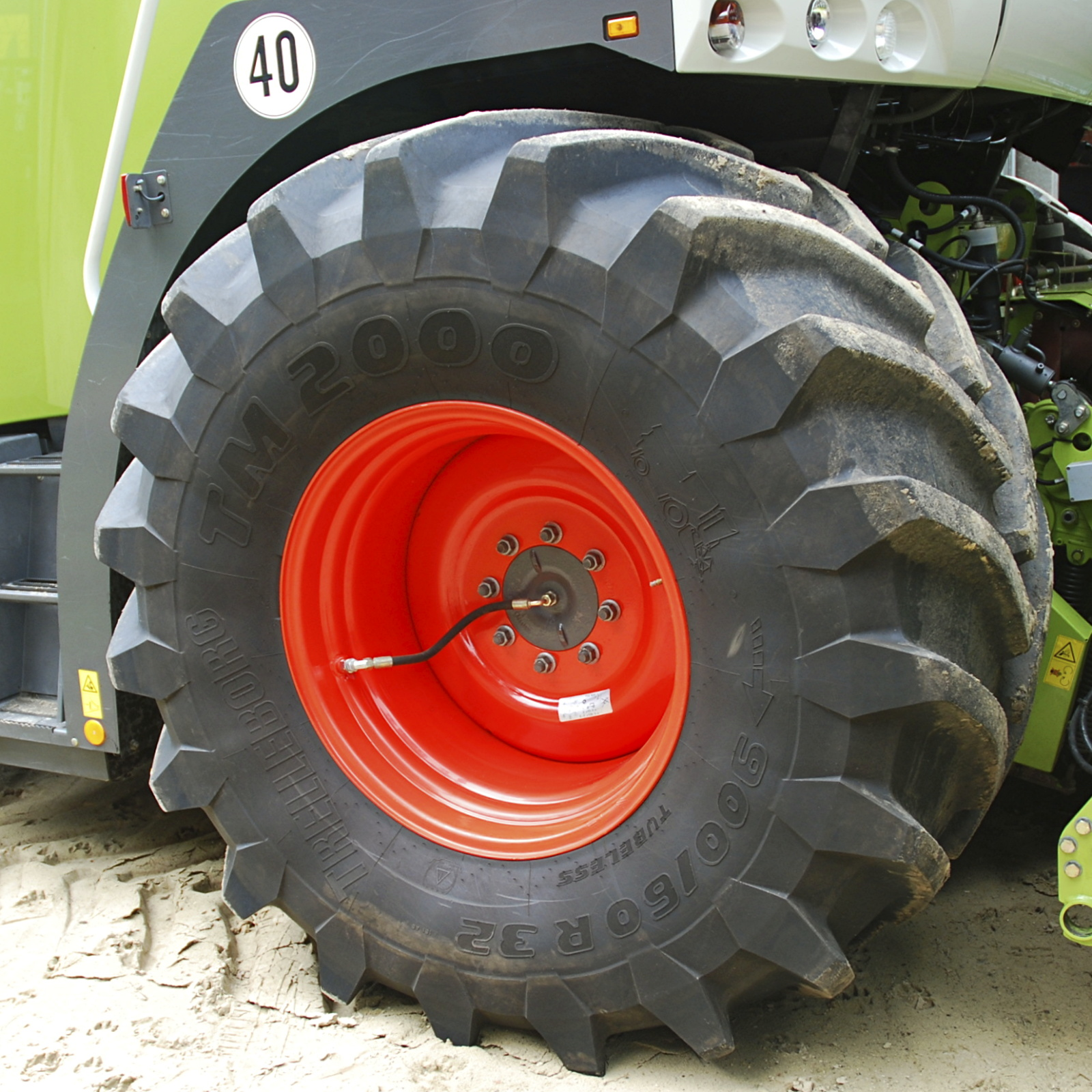
Tractor tire

The following outline is provided as an overview of and topical guide to tires:

Tire (North American) or tyre (British) – ring-shaped covering that fits around a wheel rim to protect it and enable better vehicle performance by providing a flexible cushion that absorbs shock while keeping the wheel in close contact with the ground.

== Tire Industry History ==
- Robert William Thomson – Scottish businessman and inventor
- John Boyd Dunlop – Scottish inventor and veterinary surgeon
- Harvey du Cros – British financier and businessman
- Firestone and Ford tire controversy – 1990s safety scandal involving Ford Explorer SUVs fitted with Firestone tires
- Charles Goodyear Medal – Award by the American Chemical Society, Rubber Division
- Harvey S. Firestone – American businessman (1868{{En dash
- Benjamin Goodrich – American industrialist

== Types ==
=== By construction ===
- Tubeless tire
- Radial tire
- Low rolling resistance tire
- Run-flat tire

- Michelin PAX System

- Airless tire

- Energy return wheel
- Tweel

=== By tread ===
- Rain tyre
- Snow tire
- All-terrain tire

- Bar grip
- Knobby tire
- Large tire
- Mud-terrain tire
- Paddle tire

=== By appearance ===
- Whitewall tire

=== Vehicle specific ===
- Aircraft tire

- Tundra tire

- Bicycle tire

- Tubular tire

- Lego tire
- Motorcycle tire
- Tractor tire

=== Use specific ===
- Racing slick

- Formula One tires

- Spare tire

- Continental tire

== Components and materials ==
- Orange oil tires
- Natural rubber
- Butyl rubber
- 6PPD
- Bead

- Beadlock

- Tread

- Siping (rubber)

- Valve stem

- Dunlop valve
- Presta valve
- Schrader valve

- Inner tube

== Attributes ==
- Camber thrust – Force from tire camber angle
- Circle of forces – Diagram of tire forces in vehicle dynamics
- Cold inflation pressure – Inflation pressure of tires before a car is driven
- Contact patch – Portion of a tire that is in contact with the road
- Cornering force – Force produced by a vehicle tire during cornering
- Ground pressure – Pressure exerted on the ground by the tires or tracks of a motorized vehicle
- Pacejka's Magic Formula – Dutch automotive engineer
- Pneumatic trail – Offset in tire force application point
- Relaxation length – Property of pneumatic tires
- Rolling resistance – Force resisting the motion when a body rolls on a surface
- Self aligning torque – Torque aligning tire to travel direction
- Slip angle – Term or maneuver in vehicle dynamics
- Steering ratio – Ratio in automotive engineering
- Tire balance – Mass distribution in an automobile tire
- Tire load sensitivity – Behaviour of tires under load
- Tire uniformity – Dynamic mechanical properties of pneumatic tires

- Lateral Force Variation
- Radial Force Variation

- Traction (mechanics) – Force used to generate motion between a body and a tangential surface
- Treadwear rating – Standards for passenger car tires

== Behaviors ==
- Aquaplaning – Loss of traction due to water buildup under tires
- Groove wander
- Rolling – Type of motion which combines translation and rotation with respect to a surface
- Slip (vehicle dynamics) – Motion between surfaces
- Tramlining

== Maintenance ==
- Tire maintenance
- Tire rotation

=== Inflation ===
- Bicycle pump
- Central Tire Inflation System
- Tire mousse
- Tire-pressure monitoring system
- Tire-pressure gauge

- Direct TPMS

=== Tools ===
- Bead breaker
- Tire changer
- Tire iron

== Life cycle ==
- Tire manufacturing

- List of tire companies

- Retread
- Scrap-/Waste tires
- Tire recycling
- Tire fire

=== Failure ===
- Belt Edge Separation
- Blowout
- Flat tire
- Ozone cracking

== Organizations ==
=== Manufacturing Companies ===
- Apollo Tyres – Indian tyre manufacturing company
- Bridgestone – Japanese multinational manufacturing corporation
- Continental AG – German multinational automotive component supplier
- Cooper Tire & Rubber Company – Tire manufacturing company
- Double Coin – Chinese tire manufacturer
- Dunlop Rubber – British multinational company manufacturing natural rubber goods
- Giti Tire – Tire company
- Goodyear Tire and Rubber Company – American multinational tire manufacturer
- Hankook – South Korean tire manufacturer
- Kumho Tire – South Korean tire manufacturer
- Linglong Tire – Chinese tire manufacturing enterprise
- Maxxis – Tire manufacturer
- Michelin – French multinational tyre manufacturing company
- MRF (company) – Indian tyre manufacturing company
- Nexen Tire – South Korean tire manufacturer
- Nokian Tyres – Finnish tyre company
- Pirelli – Italian multinational tyre manufacturer
- Sumitomo Rubber Industries – Japanese tire and rubber company
- Toyo Tires – Japanese tire manufacturing company
- Yokohama Rubber Company – Japanese tire and rim manufacturing company
- Hangzhou Zhongce Rubber Company – Chinese tyre manufacturer

=== Standards ===
- European Tyre and Rim Technical Organisation – Motor standards organisation
- National Highway Traffic Safety Administration – American agency of the Executive Branch of the Department of Transportation
- Tire and Rim Association

=== Technical ===
- ACS Rubber Division – American scientific society

- Rubber Chemistry and Technology

- SAE International – Professional association and standards organization for transport and other industries
- Tire Society – Professional body

- Tire Science and Technology – Academic journal published by the Tire Society

== Identification ==
- Tire code – Alphanumeric code specifying tire sizes and limits

- Plus sizing – Practice of fitting larger wheels with low‑profile tires
- Tire label – Mark for motor vehicle tyres

- Uniform Tire Quality Grading – Standards for passenger car tires

== Regulation and Standards ==
- Federal Motor Vehicle Safety Standards – US federal vehicle regulations
- Regulation 30 of United Nations Economic Commission for Europe
- SAE J1269 – Standard test of tire rolling resistance
- SAE J2452

== See also ==
- Forensic tire tread evidence

- Skid mark

- Road slipperiness
- Roadway noise
- Rubber-tyred metro
- Rubber-tyred tram
- Snow chains
- Vehicle dynamics
