= August Schrader =

German-American inventor (1807–1894)

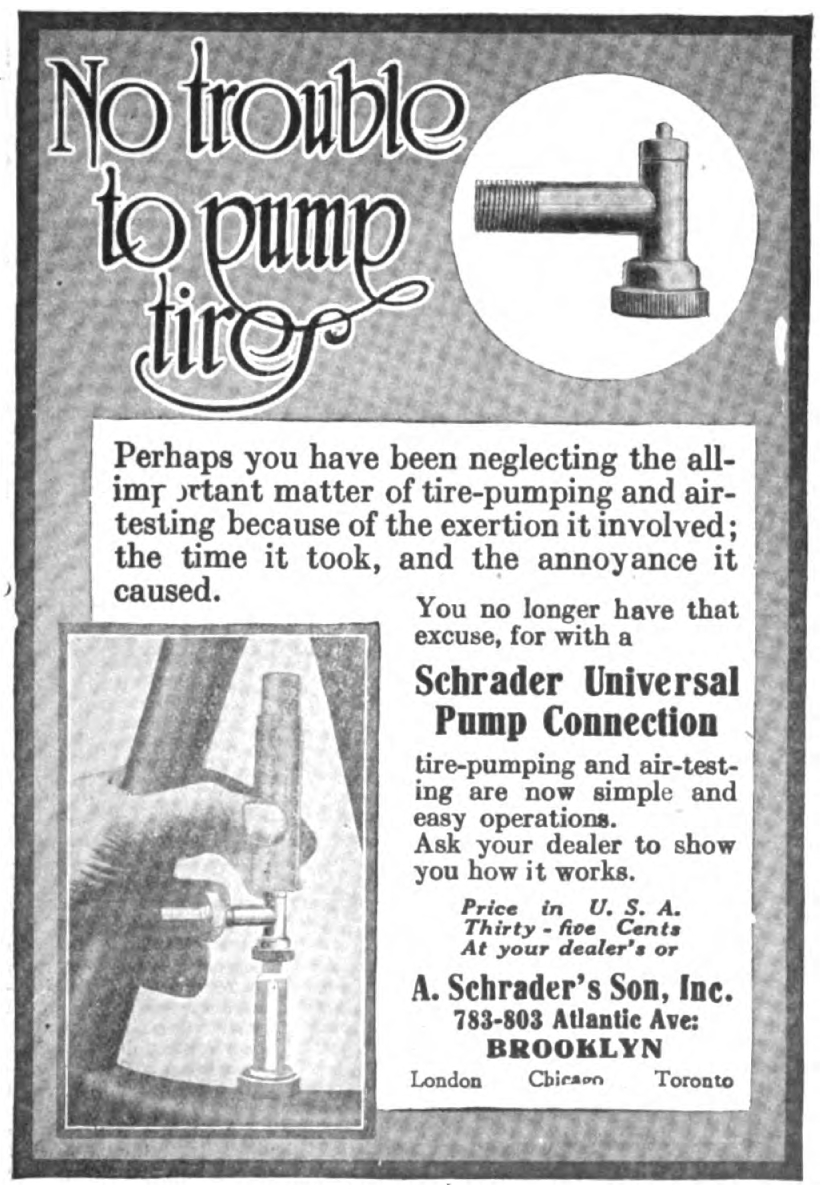
A Schrader valve advertisement in the journal Horseless Age, 1918.

August Schrader (1807–1894) was a German-American inventor and mechanic.

== Life ==
Schrader immigrated from Germany to the United States and opened a shop dealing in rubber products in Manhattan, New York City. His original shop was located at 115 John Street.

In 1845, he began supplying fittings and valves for rubber products made by the Goodyear Brothers, including air pillows and life preservers. He also made daguerreotype apparatus. Then he went into partnership with Christian Baecher, a brass turner and finisher.

After watching divers at work, Schrader sought to improve diving helmets. In 1849, he created a new copper helmet. Later, his interest in diving led him to design an air pump.

== Schrader valve ==
As with the introduction of the bicycle, early automobiles had solid wheels similar to those on carriages, followed by solid hard rubber.

Around 1890, after reports of English cyclists' success using pneumatic tires, August Schrader saw the need for a bicycle tire valve. By 1891 he had produced the Schrader valve, which was his most popular invention and is still used today on many bicycle tires.

August's son, George Schrader (1858–1915), who is generally credited with the experimental work that resulted in the valve's creation, patented the Schrader valve in 1893.

The Schrader valve is used on virtually all automobile tires, motorcycle tires, aircraft tires, most wider-rimmed bicycle tires, as well as in almost all other pneumatic tires such as on lawn mowers and all-terraine vehicles.

In addition, Schrader valves are used on many refrigeration and air conditioning systems to allow servicing, including recharging with refrigerant; by plumbers conducting leak-down pressure tests on pipe installations; as a bleeding and test port on the fuel rail of some fuel injected engines; on bicycle air shock absorbers to allow adjustment of air pressure according to the rider's weight; for medical gas outlets within hospitals and some medical vehicles; and in the buoyancy compensator (BC) inflators of SCUBA systems where the ability to easily disconnect an air hose (even underwater) without the loss of tank air is critical.

Schrader valves are also widely used in high-pressure hydraulic systems on aircraft.

In addition to the Schrader valve, bicycles can come with Presta and Dunlop valves.
