= Space hopper =

Type of toy

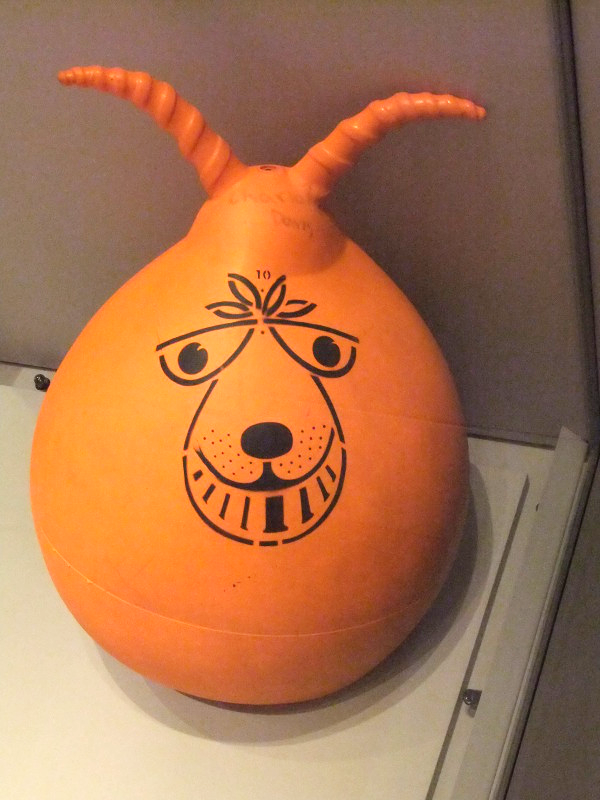
A space hopper

A space hopper (also known as a moon hopper, skippyball, kangaroo ball, bouncer, hippity hop, hoppity hop, sit and bounce, or hopper ball) is a rubber ball (similar to an exercise ball) with handles that allow one to sit on it without falling off. The user can attempt to hop around on the toy, using its elastic properties to move forward.

The term "space hopper" is more common in the United Kingdom. The toy is less familiar in the United States and may be known as a "hoppity hop", "hippity hop", or a "sit and bounce". A similar toy, popular in the United States in the 1980s, was the pogo ball, which has a hard plastic ring encircling the ball instead of a handle.

== Use ==
The space hopper is a heavy rubber ball about 60–70 centimetres (24–28 in) in diameter, with two rubber handles protruding from the top. A valve at the top allows the ball to be inflated by a bicycle pump or car tire pump.

A child can sit on top, holding the two handles, and bounce up and down until the ball leaves the ground. By leaning, the driver can make the ball bounce in a particular direction. In practical terms, this is a very inefficient form of locomotion, but its simplicity, ease of use, low cost, and cheerful appearance appeal to children.

== History ==
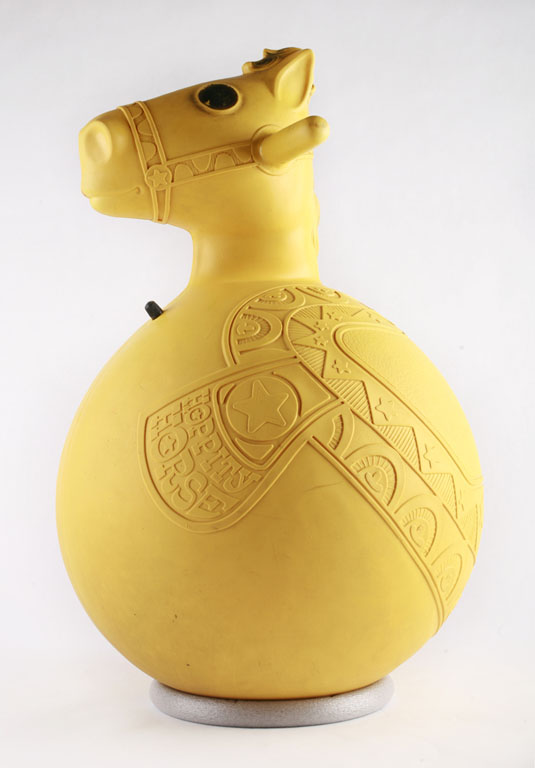
Sun's Hoppity Horse, from the Children's Museum of Indianapolis collection

The space hopper was invented by Aquilino Cosani of Ledragomma, an Italian company that manufactured toy rubber balls. He patented the idea in Italy in 1968, and in the United States in 1971. Cosani called the toy "Pon-Pon".

Space hoppers were introduced to the United Kingdom in 1969. The Cambridge Evening News contained an advertisement for the hopper in November of that year and described it as a trend. The space hopper became a major craze for several years and remained widely popular through the 1980s. The toy is sometimes considered a symbol of the 1970s.

The original space hopper in the United Kingdom was manufactured by Mettoy (Mettoy-Corgi). Wembley made a similar model, which had smooth handles rather than the ribbed original. The orange kangaroo design is now available in adult-sized versions in the UK.

In the United States, the first mass-marketed hopping ball was a version of an earlier European toy—the Hoppity Hop, released by the Sun company after it introduced the ball in 1968 at the American International Toy Fair in New York.

Within the first three months, more than 300,000 units were sold across the country. Because of market and media saturation of this toy, any such ball, regardless of origin, is now generally known in the US by that name.

The earliest Hoppity Hops were made of rubber (usually red or blue) with a round ring handle on top and an automotive tire valve for inflation. In the 1970s, Sun introduced various character versions of the Hoppity Hop, such as the Hoppity Horse or Disney's Mickey Mouse and Donald Duck (with hard plastic versions of the character's head attached to the ball).

The Hoppity Hop sold steadily for decades, but by the 1990s, sales began to slip due to increased competition from foreign hoppers.

According to advertising materials, the Hoppity Hop's original targets were both adults and children. Since the balls only inflated to around 20 inches (51 cm), however, it is doubtful that any but the shortest adults could have gotten much use out of one.

The European "Hop!" balls appeared in the beginning of the 1990s and are still available. Made by Italy's Ledragomma/Ledraplastic, these are essentially an exercise ball with a handle attached. The sizes of these balls range from the "Hop! 45" to the "Hop! 66" (66 cm, about 26 in).

The Hop! 66 is still primarily child-sized. Demand for truly adult-proportioned hopping balls was met with two notable items: The first was Kitt 2000 Velp, of the Netherlands Mega Skippyballs, a large hopping ball that, by virtue of its size, was intended only for adult use. It came in three sizes: 120 centimetres (47 in), 100 centimetres (39 in), and 80 centimetres (31 in).

The Mega Skippyballs are made of extra-strong vinyl, and in the Netherlands, there are various Skippyball races and championships.
