= Inner tubing =

Inner tubing may mean:

- Inner tube, the rubber tube within certain tires
- Tubing (recreation), the act of riding an inner tube
