= Presta =

Presta may refer to:

- Apco Presta, an Israeli paraglider design
- Presta valve, a bicycle tire valve style
