= Bicycle pump =

Air pump used for inflating bicycle tires

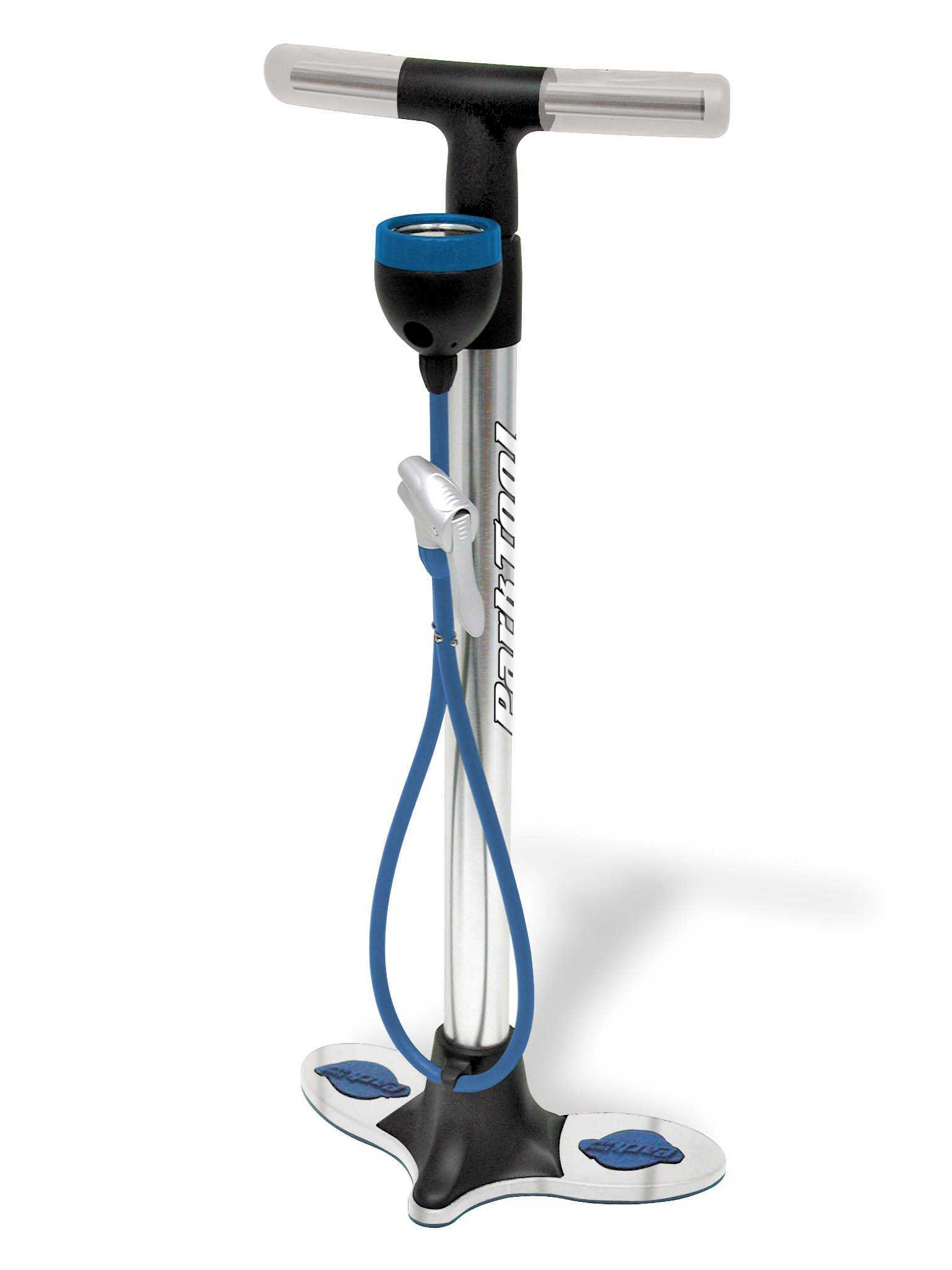
Bicycle floor pump

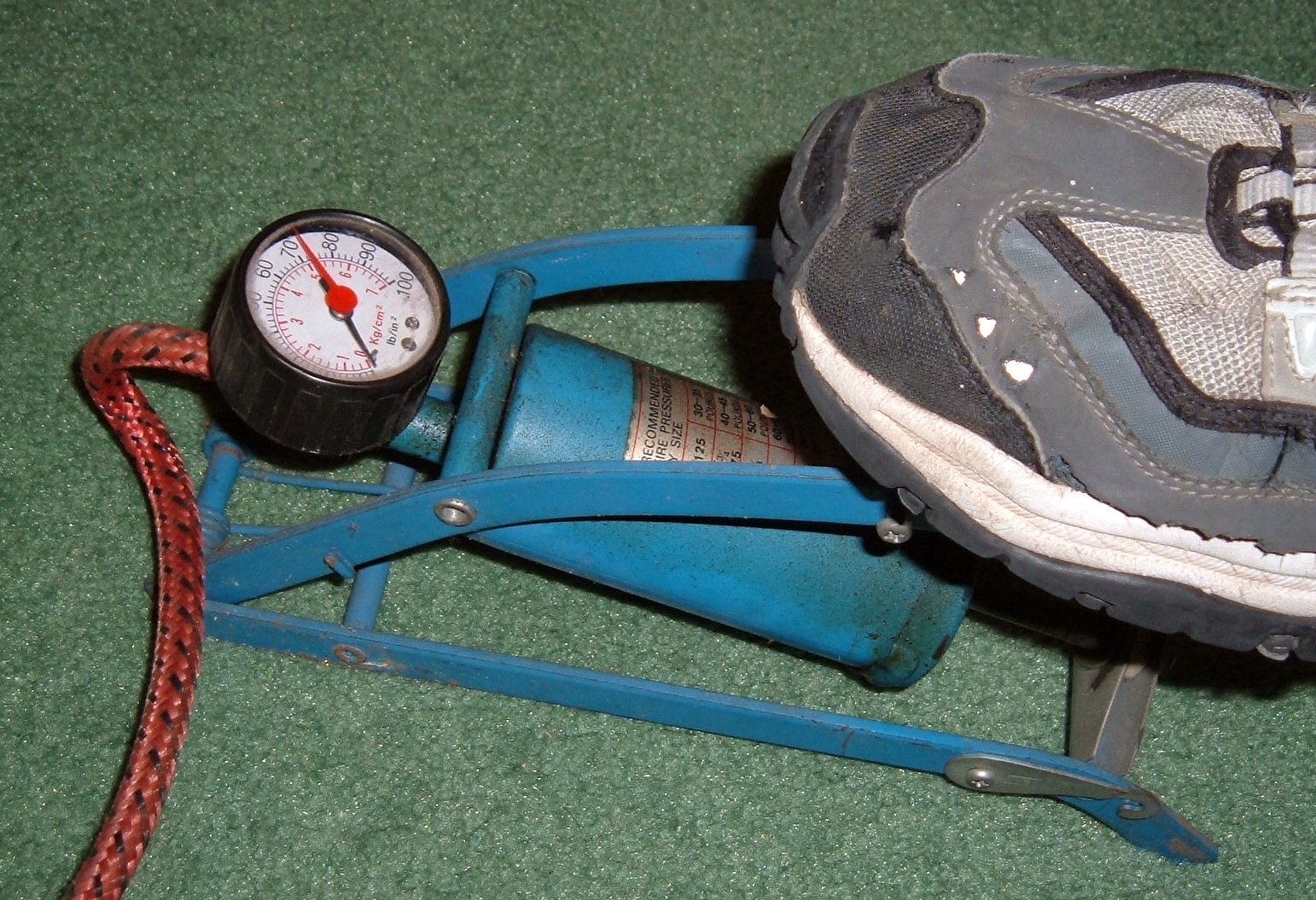
Foot-operated bike pump

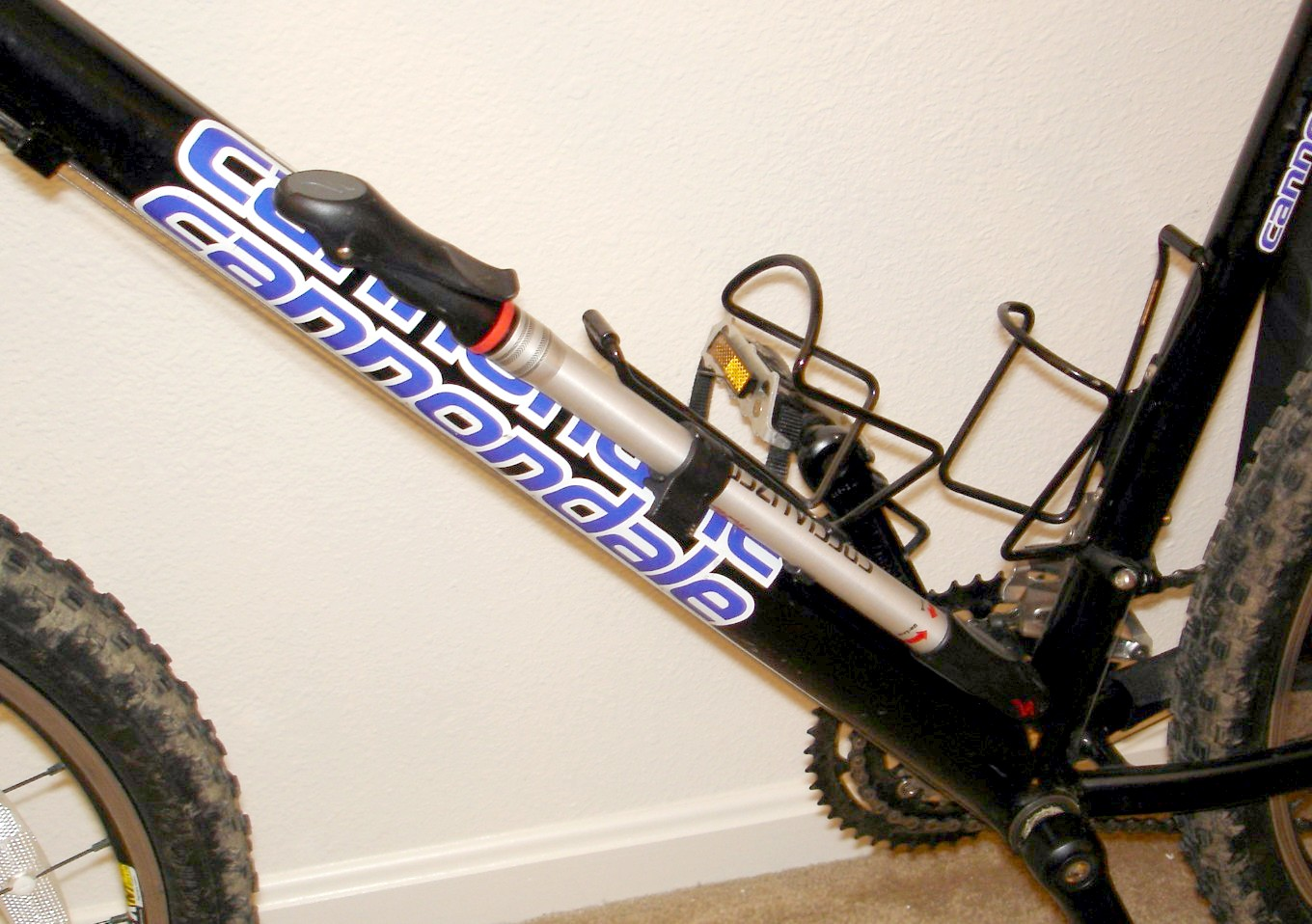
Frame-mounted bike pump

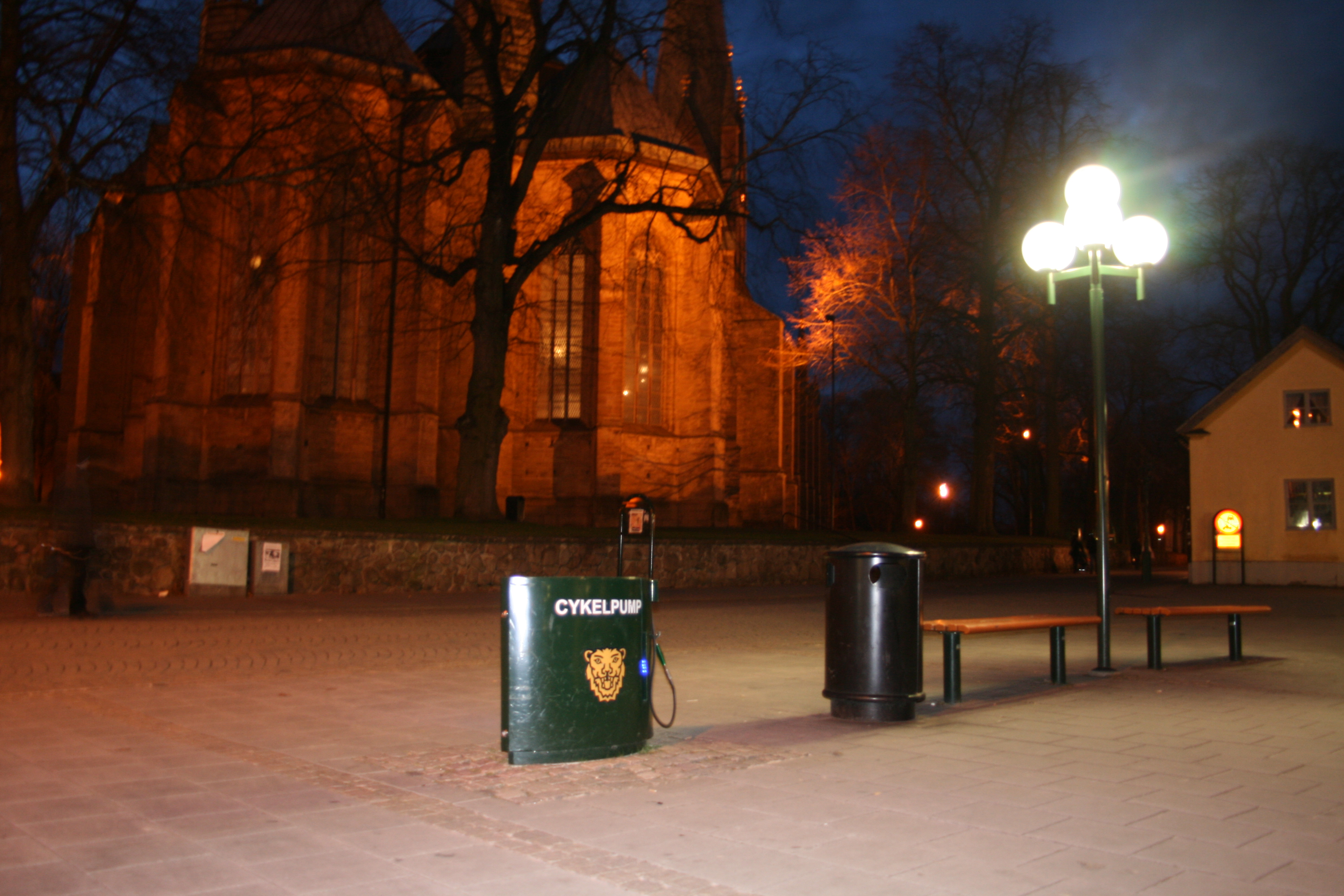
Outdoor public air compressor for bicycles.

A bicycle pump is a type of positive-displacement air pump specifically designed for inflating bicycle tires. It has a connection or adapter for use with one or both of the two most common types of valves used on bicycles, Schrader or Presta. A third type of valve called the Dunlop (or Woods) valve exists, but tubes with these valves can be filled using a Presta pump.

Several basic types are available:

- Floor pumps
- Frame-mounted
- Compact or mini
- Foot-operated
- Double-action
- Blast or tubeless

In its most basic form, a bicycle pump functions via a hand-operated piston. During up-stroke, this piston draws air through a one-way valve into the pump from outside. During down-stroke, the piston then displaces air from the pump into the bicycle tire. Most floor pumps, also commonly called track pumps, have a built-in pressure gauge to indicate tire pressure.

Electrically-operated pumps intended to inflate car tires (as available in most service stations) can in principle be used to inflate a bicycle tire if the right type of connection is available. Some such pumps are designed to cut off before a suitable pressure (much higher for a bicycle than a car tire), and will much under inflate the tire. Others may not cut off, but deliver a high rate of flow to fill the larger car tire, with a risk of over inflating and bursting a bicycle tire unless it is stopped with split-second timing.

Inflating tubeless tires requires an initial surge of air to seat the bead, and specialized pumps are available specifically for this task.

== History ==
It is not known when the first bicycle pump was invented, but it is believed to have been in or around 1887, which is when the first inflatable tire or pneumatic tire was produced by John Boyd Dunlop of Scotland. The first bicycle pump consisted of a metal cylinder that had a metal rod running down the middle of it. This would have forced the air out of the cylinder and then sucked in new air when the metal rod was pulled up again. Many modern pumps use a very similar method, while some, such as the electric pumps, use an automated pumping mechanism.

== How they work ==
The bicycle pump compresses air. When the cylinder is compressed, air is pushed down the tube of the pump and then into the tire via the valve, which is forced open by the pressure of the air. When the handle is pulled up again, the valve shuts off automatically so that the air cannot escape from the tire, and new air is forced back into the cylinder so the process can be repeated. Some pumps have a gauge that shows the pressure of air that is forced into the tire. Once the tire is at the correct pressure, the pump valve can be removed from the tire, and the cap can be replaced on the tire valve.

There are two main types of tire valves to which the bicycle tire pump attaches. These are the Presta valve and the Schrader valve. Some pumps fit both types of valves, whereas others do not, but adapters are available that enable the pump to fit any type of valve. "All valves adjustable connecting systems," also known as AVACS, enable the pump to fit any type of valve found on a bicycle, and it also has the capacity to fit onto other universal inflatable products, such as balls, paddling pools, and rubber rings. The AVACS feature is commonly available on pump models and can also be bought as a separate valve attachment. It also works by repeatedly pulling and pushing activities of the Piston.

== Types ==
There are three main types of bicycle pumps

- Stand pump
- Hand pump
- Foot pump

=== Stand pump ===
Also known as a floor or track pump. To operate, the user rests the base of the pump on the floor, resting feet at the base, and pulls and pushes full strokes with handles. An additional tube must connect the pump to the fill valve, which may create dead volume.

=== Hand pump ===
There are two basic types: tubed and integral. The tubed type requires a separate tube to connect the pump to the valve. These have the advantage that they are cheap, but are inefficient compared to other pumps. They also have a lot of joints from which air can escape.

Integral pumps have a hole in the side with a rubber washer that fits round the valve. This is frequently compressed on to the valve by an extra lever. Because it is well sealed, rigid and has little dead volume, this type of pump is very efficient. An 8″ integral will typically pump faster than an 18″ tubed. These types of pumps will run the risk of shredding the tube valves, especially on those with presta valves.

A simple pump has a cupped fiber or plastic piston. On the forward stroke the air pushes the sides of the cup against the cylinder, so forming a seal; it provides its own valve. Then this piston can push the air out of the hole at the far end.

Some of the most efficient pumps are double action pumps. By sealing the piston in the cylinder at both ends they can force air into the tire on both strokes.

Pumps can be fitted to a bracket on the bike frame, either a clamp on, screw on, or a braze-on peg, or they can be carried in a pannier or other bag on the bike, or they can be carried by the rider in a backpack, pocket, etc.

==== Mini pump ====
Mini pumps (or compact pumps) are usually hand pumps that have been made very small and light, so that they can readily be carried on a bicycle for emergency use; they can fit in pockets, saddle bags, or even include a water bottle bracket. Because of their small size, the volume of air that these pumps can provide is somewhat limited compared to a floor pump, so quite a lot of pumping may be needed.

=== Foot pump ===
These pumps are often not specifically designed for bicycle use. They do not generate very high pressures so do not work well for narrow road-bike tires, but are fine for large low-pressure tires as found on mountain bikes.

Because they are designed for cars they fit Schrader valves. If the bicycle has Presta valves a small brass reducer is required in order to use the pump.

=== CO_{2} inflators ===
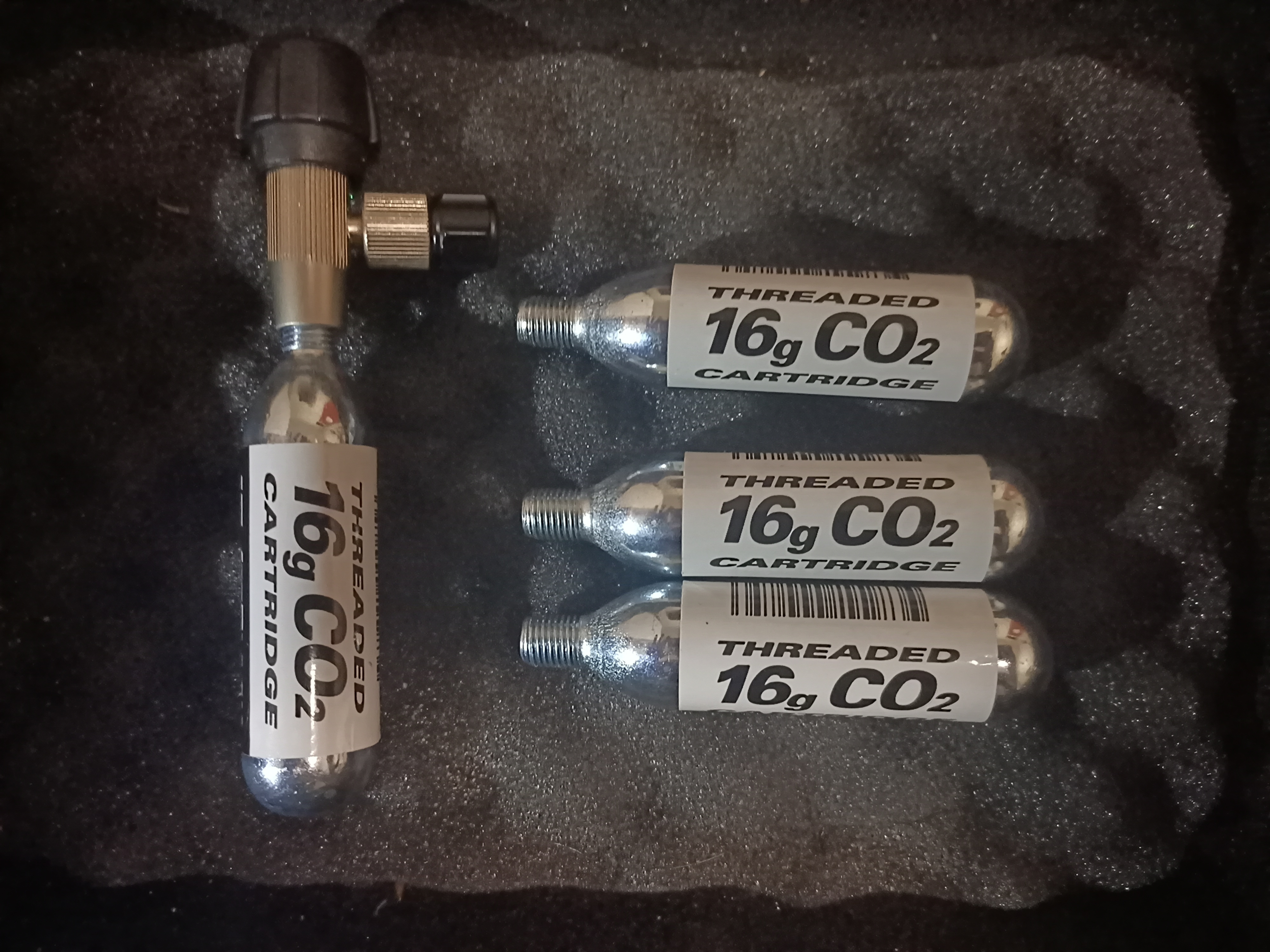
CO₂ inflator fitted with a threaded 16 g cartridge, shown with spare cartridges.

Gas-filled cylinders for bicycles have an unclear history but appear to have appeared between the two World Wars. One story says they were made "by a rider after watching a café proprietor charge up the glass of beer he had ordered from a bottle of carbon dioxide." The pumps generally used liquefied gas that could not be replaced at home. A later version, which had more success, used a cartridge sold originally for drinks siphons. A lever broke the cartridge and enough gas escaped to inflate a tire.

Modern gas pumps are often used by mountain bike or road bike racers who need to save weight, and to save time if they puncture during a race. They can be a one-time pump or a pump that can be fitted with a replacement cartridge and can rapidly inflate a tyre sufficiently in seconds. Most pumps use carbon dioxide and standard-threaded 16g CO_{2} canisters.

Carbon dioxide diffuses through butyl and latex inner tubes more quickly than atmospheric air as the CO_{2} molecule is significantly more soluble than Oxygen and Nitrogen in rubber, causing tyres inflated with CO₂ to lose pressure faster over time. For this reason, cyclists often use CO₂ inflators for emergencies and then reinflate tyres with air when possible after initial CO₂ inflation.

=== Electric pump ===
Lamicell electric air pump inflating a bicycle tyre

Twelve-volt air compressors made for automobile tires are also compatible with bicycle tires. A portable jump-starter for automobiles can sometimes be used to power these types of pumps. Even non-standard do-it-yourself (DIY) 12-volt electric systems that are primarily for bicycle lighting are sometimes used to power these pumps when cigar lighter receptacles are installed. There are also portable electric pumps that can be charged by USB and have a built-in digital pressure gauge, allowing cyclists to monitor tyre pressure without needing a separate pressure gauge. They require a charged battery or other power source but their main advantage over conventional pumps is that inflation is hands-free and relatively fast.

== Tire pressure ==
The pressure rating of tires is usually stamped somewhere on the sidewall. This may be in psi (pounds per square inch) or bar. The pressure rating could be indicated as "Maximum Pressure," or "Inflate to . . . " and will usually give a range (for example, 90-120 psi, or 35-60 psi). Inflating to the lower number in the pressure range will increase traction and make the ride more comfortable. Inflating to the higher number will make the ride more efficient and will decrease the chances of getting a flat tire but a firmer ride must be expected.

=== Pressure output ===
The maximum pressure, or how much air the pump can force into a tire, is an important consideration. The pump needs to match or exceed the stated air pressure the tires can handle. If the maximum air pressure is too low, it will not be able to adequately inflate the tires, no matter how hard it is used.

== See also ==
- Valve stem
