= Dunlop valve =

Bicycle tube valve

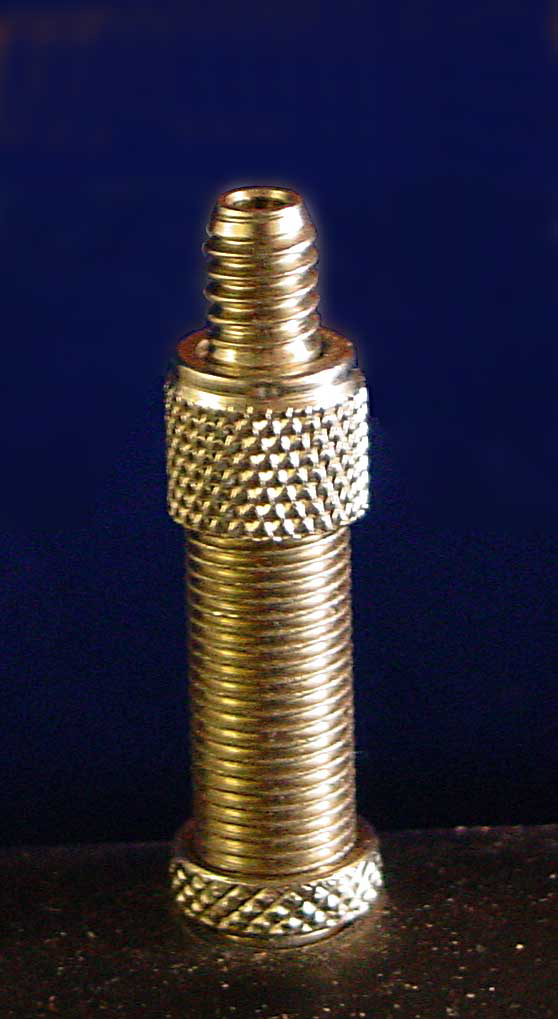
Dunlop valve stem

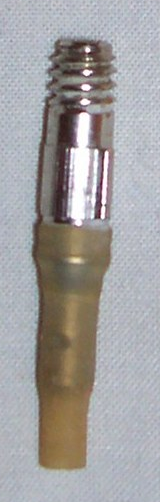
Dunlop valve with tube

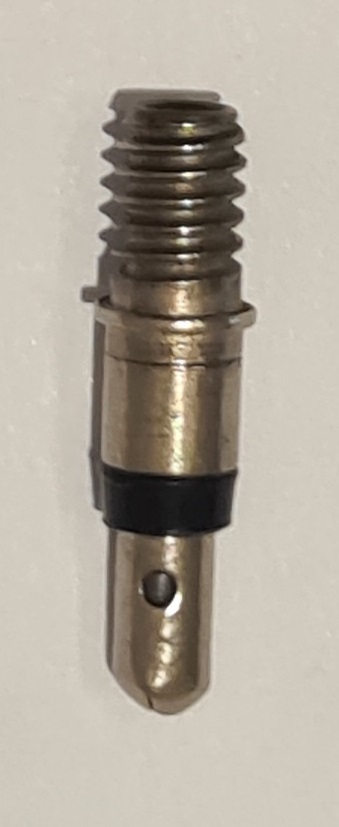
Dunlop valve without tube

The Dunlop valve, (abbreviated as DV; also called a Woods valve, an English valve or a Blitz valve) is a type of pneumatic valve stem in use—mostly on inner tubes of bicycles—in many countries, including Japan, Korea, India, Pakistan, Sri Lanka, most European countries, and a number of developing countries. The Dunlop valve has a wider base than a Presta valve, similar enough in size to a Schrader valve to use identically drilled valve holes in rims, but it can be inflated with a Presta valve adapter. The inner mechanism of the valve can be replaced easily, without the need for special tools.

The Dunlop valve originally used a tight rubber sleeve (see illustration of "original plug") which had to be forced open by air pressure while pumping (not only were these difficult to inflate, but the rubber would perish over time, allowing leakage and eventually, complete failure), but modern Dunlop valves use a different plug (core) using either an internal ball bearing or a spring-loaded rubber plug that is unseated by pumping, making the valve as easy to pump as a Presta valve.

The inventor was C. H. Woods. It superseded Dunlop's original valve for pneumatic tyres.

Dunlop valves are uncommon on bicycles in the US, where either Presta or Schrader valves are used.

== Dimensions ==
The external thread of a Dunlop valve is 0.305-32 TPI (approx. 7.75×0.794 mm in metric designation).

== See also ==
- Dunlop Rubber
- Bicycle tire
- Inner tube
