= Presta valve =

Bicycle tube valve

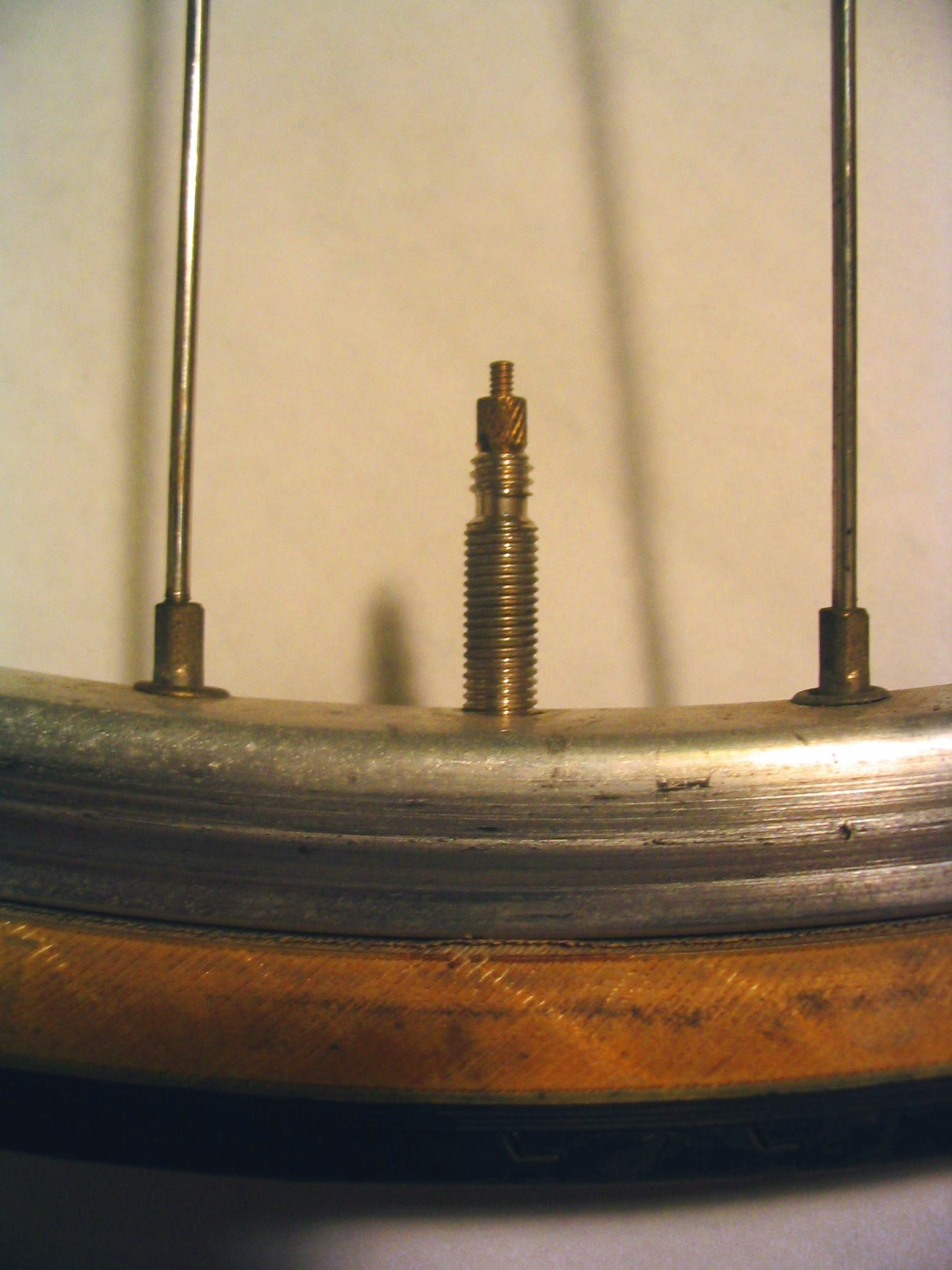
A Presta valve shown in context of the rim, spokes, and tire of a bicycle wheel

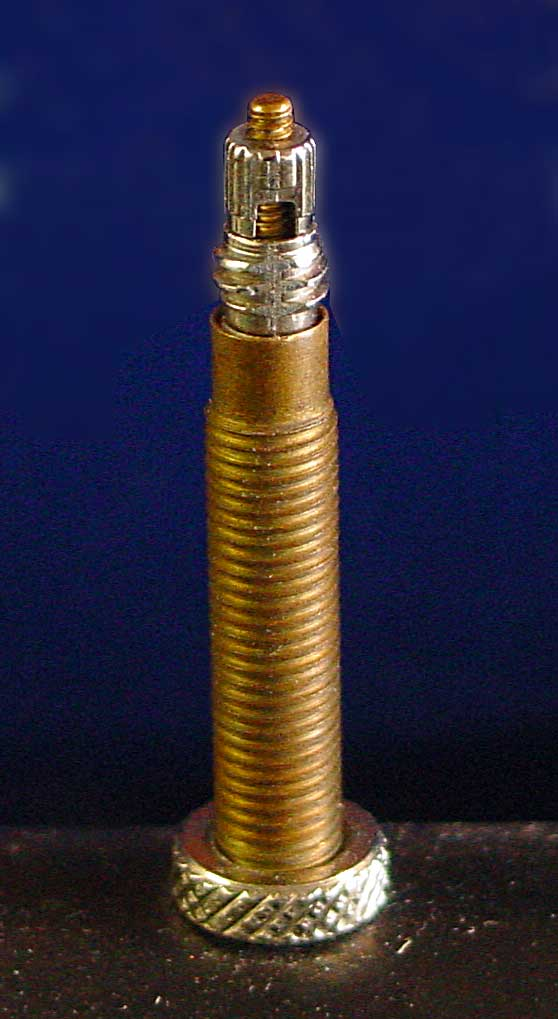
A closed Presta valve

The Presta valve (also French valve (FV) or Sclaverand valve) is a type of tire valve commonly found on high pressure bicycle inner tubes and is commonly used on tubeless setups. It consists of an outer valve stem and an inner valve body. A lock nut to secure the stem at the wheel rim and a valve cap may also be present.

== Name ==
The Sclaverand valve was invented by Frenchman Étienne Sclaverand and is often referred to as the French valve. Today it is also known as Presta valve. Presta or presto stands in the Romance languages for "fast, hurry, immediately".

== Description ==
The outer valve stem is manufactured in various lengths to cater for the different depths of the wheel or rim. It is recommended the valve stem is to be at least 10 mm longer than the rim is deep to allow adequate room for the bicycle pump to be attached. It has a narrower diameter of 6 mm (0.24 in), compared to Dunlop and Schrader valves, measuring 8 mm (0.31 in). The weakest point of a bicycle rim is usually the hole for the valve stem. The smaller hole for a Presta valve makes it possible to have extremely narrow wheels while maintaining sufficient strength in the wheel.

The air pressure in an inflated tire holds the inner valve body shut. A small screw and captive nut on the top of the valve body permits the valve to be screwed shut and ensures that it remains tightly closed.

The nut must be unscrewed to permit airflow in either direction. The screw remains captive on the valve body even when unscrewed fully; it is tightened again after the tire is inflated and the pump removed. The valve cap protects the valve body, keeps dirt and mud out of the mechanism, and also prevents the valve from damaging the tube when it is rolled for storage, but is not necessary to prevent pressure loss.

The holes in rims sized for Presta valves can be enlarged to accommodate the wider Schrader valves, which can structurally weaken the rim. Conversely, when a Presta valve is fitted into the larger Schrader rim hole, grommets or reducers are sometimes used to take up the extra space.

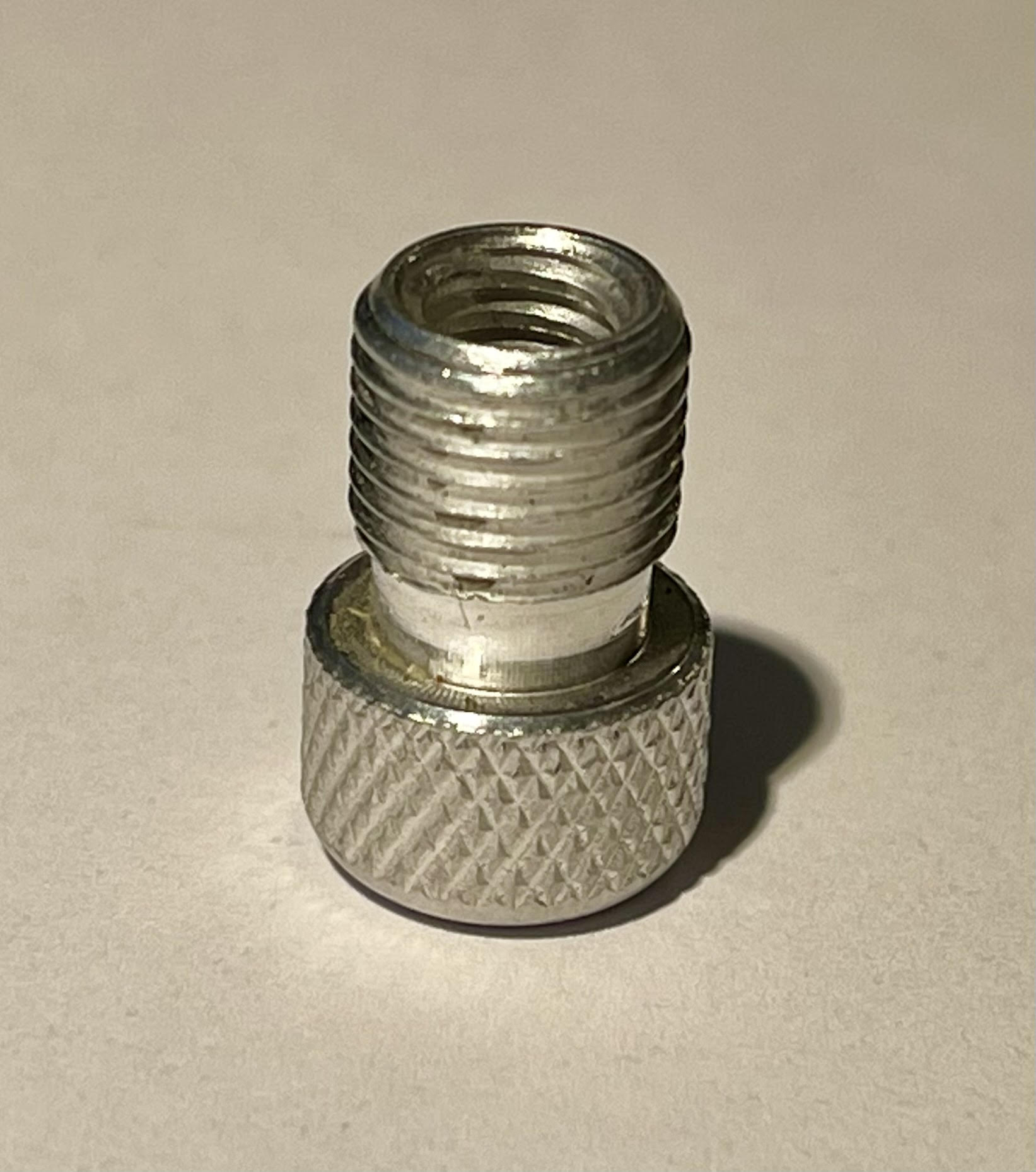
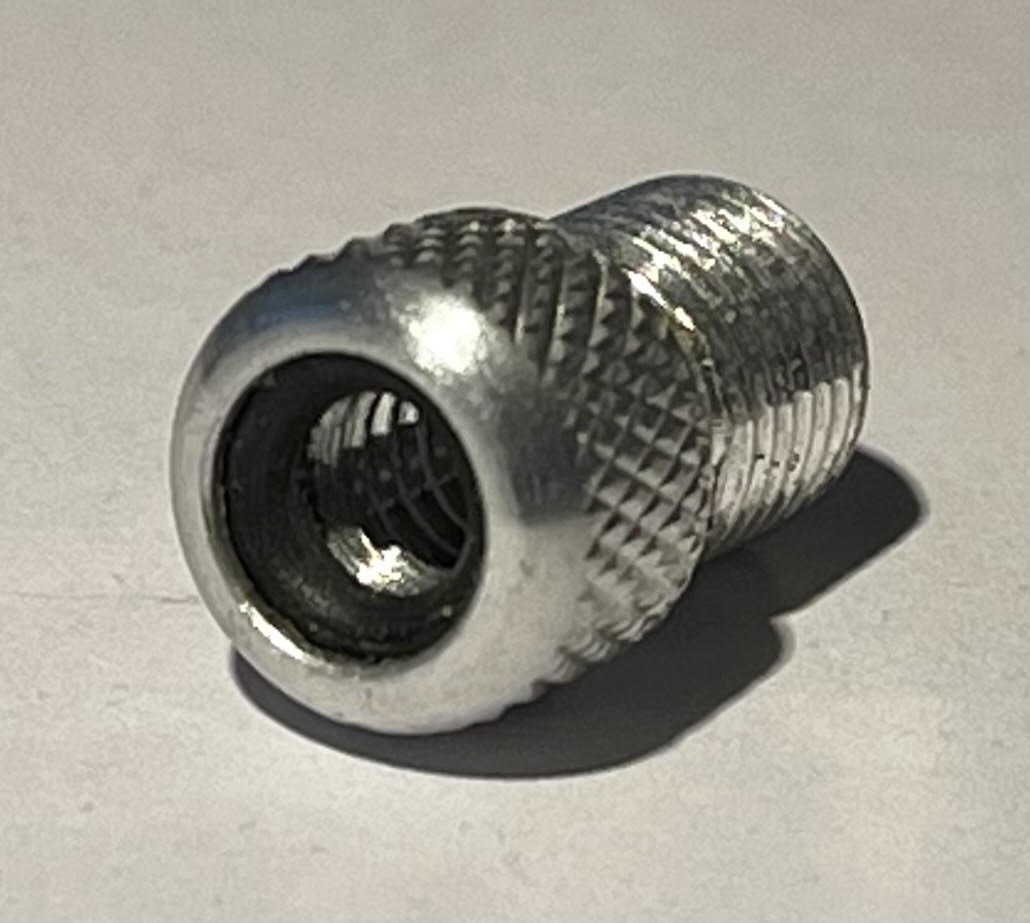
Two views of a Presta to Schrader valve adapter

The standard Presta valve has an external thread. An adapter can be fitted onto this external thread to permit the Presta valve to be connected to a pump with a Schrader or Dunlop chuck. The same adapter, because of a coincidence of thread sizes, may be able to convert a Schrader pump into one that can connect to flexible adapters of either kind.

== Removable valve cores ==
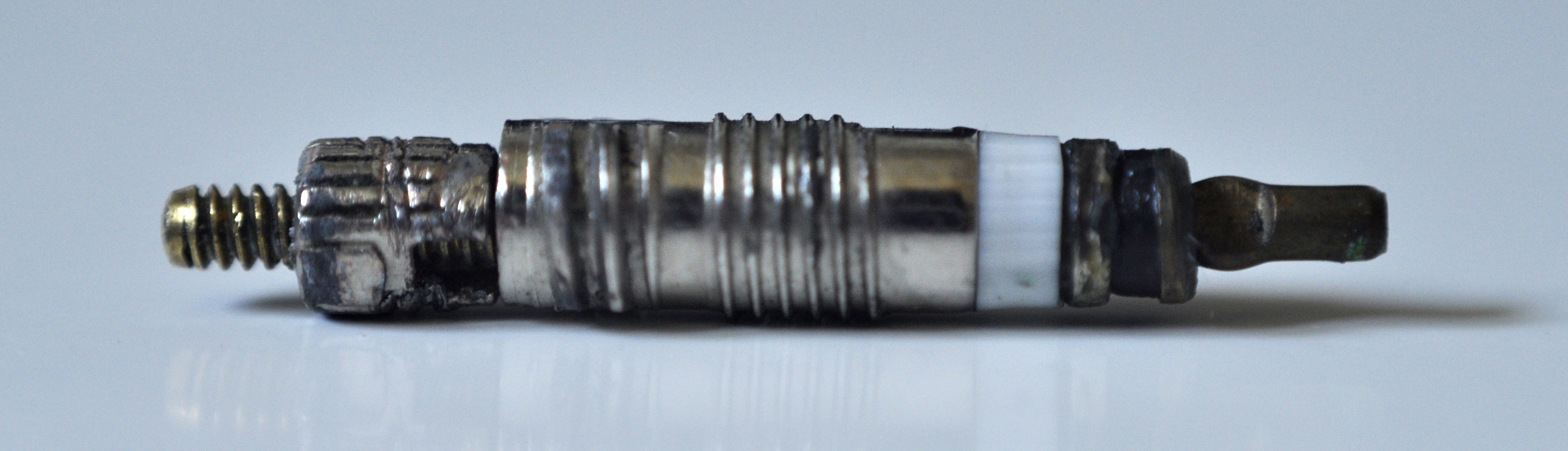
Removed Presta valve core

Unlike Schrader valves, not all Presta valves have removable cores.

Presta valves with removable cores may be used with a tube or tubeless setup to add sealant through the valve. Sealant may also be added by pouring it directly into the tire.

== Valve extenders ==
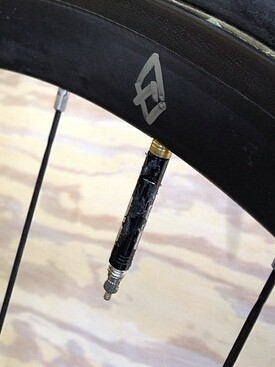
A valve extender (black) is fitted between valve stem (brass) and core (silver).

Valve extenders can be used to lengthen shorter Presta valves to accommodate deeper and thicker rims, such as those on aerodynamic race wheels. There are two variants of valve extenders depending on whether the Presta core is removable.

== Threading ==
The valve threads for Presta valves follow the ISO 4570 standard. The external threads at the tip of both "threaded" and "unthreaded" Presta valves are 5V2 (#12-24TPI), which measures out to 5.2×1.058 mm, the same thread size as the tip of a Dunlop valve. The external threads on the main body of "threaded" Presta valves are 6V1, which measures 6×0.80 mm.

== Comparison to Schrader Valves ==
A tire valve goes through a hole in the rim, and the hole slightly weakens the rim. Presta valves are thinner than Schrader valves, so can fit through a smaller hole. For bicycle rims which are narrow and lightweight (thus highly stressed), a smaller hole makes the rim and wheel stronger. For most other uses, the difference in strength is too small to matter.

Presta valves can use a push-on air chuck with a simple diaphragm seal. This can be fast on/off and also leads to a lightweight pump chuck. Schrader valves often use either screw-on chucks, which are slower; clamp-on chucks, which are heavier; or push-and-hold chucks, which must be held to prevent leaking, and which are commonly used with air compressors but rarely used with manual pumps. For bicycle racing, a Presta pump's "fast and light" can be an advantage. A push-on diaphragm Presta chuck tends to push the valve stem into the tire cavity, which slows down getting a good seal. It is thus common to secure the stem with a nut against the rim. However, the nut must be removed to change the tube, and removing the nut takes time, which is a disadvantage for racing. A diaphragm-seal chuck works on a stem without a stem nut, but it takes more skill — a disadvantage for casual use.

Presta valves use air pressure to hold the valve closed, then use a small nut to ensure the valve stays sealed in use. Loosening the nut takes time, which is a disadvantage for racing. Leaving the nut loose still allows the valve to seal, but may make it easier to have accidental (or malicious) deflation. Schrader valves use a spring to close, so Schrader chucks use a "pin" to open the valve while the chuck is attached. This avoids the Presta's nut, but leads to use of slower screw-on or heavier clamp-on Schrader chucks.

Presta valves are mainly used on bicycles, and are rarely used on cheaper bicycles. Presta pumps are thus less common. If you are carrying a pump, this is rarely an issue. For more casual use, it can be an advantage to not carry a pump - one less thing to lose, malfunction, or have stolen. However, there may not be a Presta pump available when you need it. There are adapters to fit a Schrader pump on a Presta valve, but loss/theft of the adapter can still be an issue. Adapters can leak, a disadvantage compared to a Schrader chuck on a Schrader valve.

At very high speed - approximately 150 km/h - Schrader valves can open under centrifugal force, leading to a flat tire. Racing cars often use valve caps with a seal and with the cap strong enough to withstand a tire's air pressure. A Presta valve has a nut holding the valve closed, but this is not an advantage in practice, as ordinary bicycles never go fast enough to open a Schrader valve. Further, at least some motor-paced speed record bicycles have used Schrader valves. (The actual speed of Schrader opening depends on many factors; 150 km/h is only a very rough guide. The important observation is a Presta valve's nut is not an advantage in actual use, because ordinary bicycles do not go fast enough for it to matter.)

== See also ==
- Bicycle tire
- Inner tube
- Valve stem
- Schrader valve
- Dunlop valve
