= Schrader valve =

Motor vehicle and bicycle tube valve

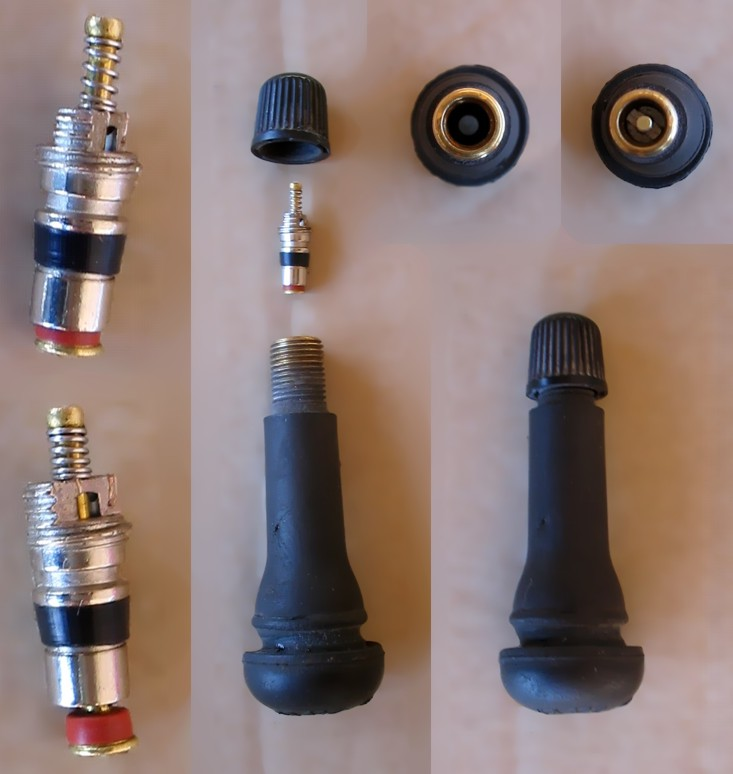
Schrader valve components (from left to right) the valve core closed (top) and open (bottom), the order of assembly, end view of stem without core and with core (top) and stem with the dust cap on (bottom). The core has a short outer thread which is screwed into the inner thread of the stem. The visible outer thread of the stem holds the dust cap.

The Schrader valve (also called American valve (AV)) is a type of pneumatic tire valve used on virtually every motor vehicle in the world today. The original Schrader valve design was invented in 1891 and patented in the United States in 1893.

The Schrader valve consists of a valve stem into which a valve core is threaded. The valve core is a poppet valve assisted by a spring. A small rubber seal located on the core keeps the gas or fluid from escaping through the threads. Using the appropriate tools, a faulty valve core can be immediately extracted from the valve stem and replaced with a new one.

== History ==
August Schrader was a German-American inventor and businessman. In 1844, he opened the Schrader company, a shop dealing in rubber products in Manhattan, New York City. In 1845, he began supplying fittings and valves for rubber products made by the Goodyear brothers, including air pillows and life preservers. In addition, he also worked on an apparatus for making daguerreotypes, diving helmets, and an air pump for use in diving.

Around 1890, after reports of English cyclists' success using pneumatic tires, August Schrader saw the need for a bicycle tire valve. Working with his son George Schrader, in 1891 they produced the Schrader valve, which was patented in the U.S. in 1893. Two years later George patented the valve cap for protecting the valve from the elements, and in 1898 the design was improved with the introduction of a replaceable valve core. The valve became popular in the early 1900s in tires for automobiles, trucks, airplanes, and other vehicles.

== Uses ==
The Schrader valve is used on virtually all automobile tires, motorcycle tires, aircraft tires, most wider-rimmed bicycle tires, as well as in almost all other pneumatic tires such as on lawn mowers and all-terrain vehicles.

In addition Schrader valves are used on many refrigeration and air conditioning systems to allow servicing, including recharging with refrigerant; by plumbers conducting leak-down pressure tests on pipe installations; as a bleeding and test port on the fuel rail of some fuel injected engines; on bicycle air shock absorbers to allow adjustment of air pressure according to the rider's weight; for medical gas outlets within hospitals and some medical vehicles.

Schrader valves are also widely used in high-pressure hydraulic systems on aircraft.

Many domestic fire extinguishers use an internal valve identical to a Schrader valve, but with a lever on top to enable quick release of the pressurized content.

It is also the same thread specification used on the shutter button of some old Leica, Yashica, and also Nikon F and F2 cameras.

== Valve ==
Long (old) version of the core

Short (modern) core being opened to allow air to escape

A Schrader valve consists of an externally threaded hollow cylindrical metal tube, typically nickel-plated brass. In the center of the exterior end is a metal pin aligned with the long axis of the tube; the pin's end is approximately flush with the end of the valve body.

All Schrader valves used on tires have threads and bodies of a single standard size at the exterior end, so caps and tools generally are universal for the valves on all common applications. The core of the valve can be removed or tightened with a two-pronged tool. Industrial Schrader valves are available in different diameters and valve core variants and are used in refrigeration, propane, and a variety of other uses.

With the advent of miniature electronics, Schrader valve stems with integrated transmitters for tire pressure monitoring systems (TPMS) became available.

== Cap ==
A valve cap on a Schrader valve prevents the entry of contaminants that may interfere with the sealing surfaces and cause leakage.

Metal, and some hard plastic valve caps, have a rubber washer or O-ring inside, both to prevent the cap from loosening and falling off due to vibration. These caps also serve as a mechanical seal or hermetic seal to prevent air from leaking from a faulty valve core. Simple caps without a seal do not reliably prevent leaks. Some metal caps are equipped with prongs to enable removing and replacing valve cores, thereby serving two functions: seal and emergency tool.

In refrigeration and air conditioning applications, the valve cap is considered to be the primary seal, with the Schrader valve only being used for service access.

== Schrader versus other valve types ==
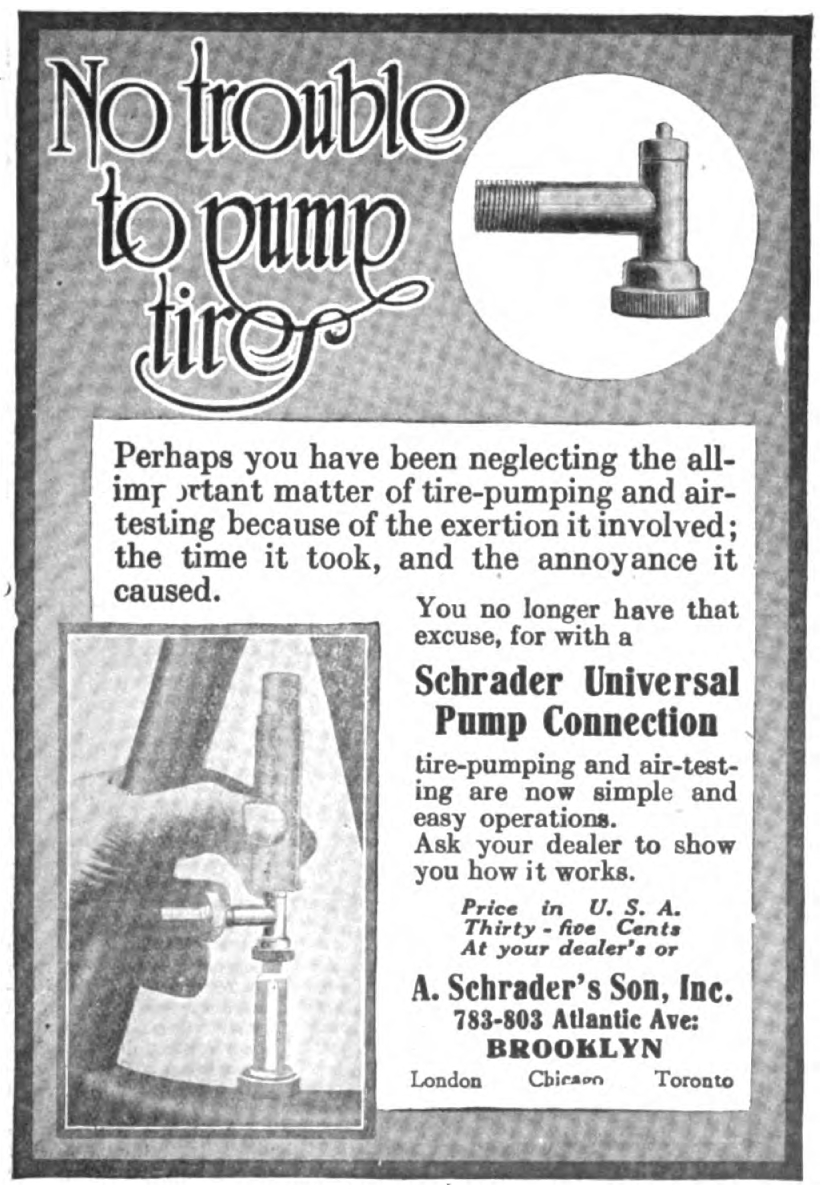
A Schrader valve advertisement, Horseless Age, 1918

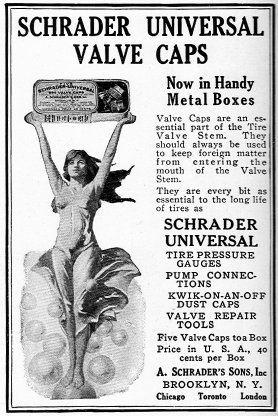
Schrader valve advertisement, National Geographic April, 1921

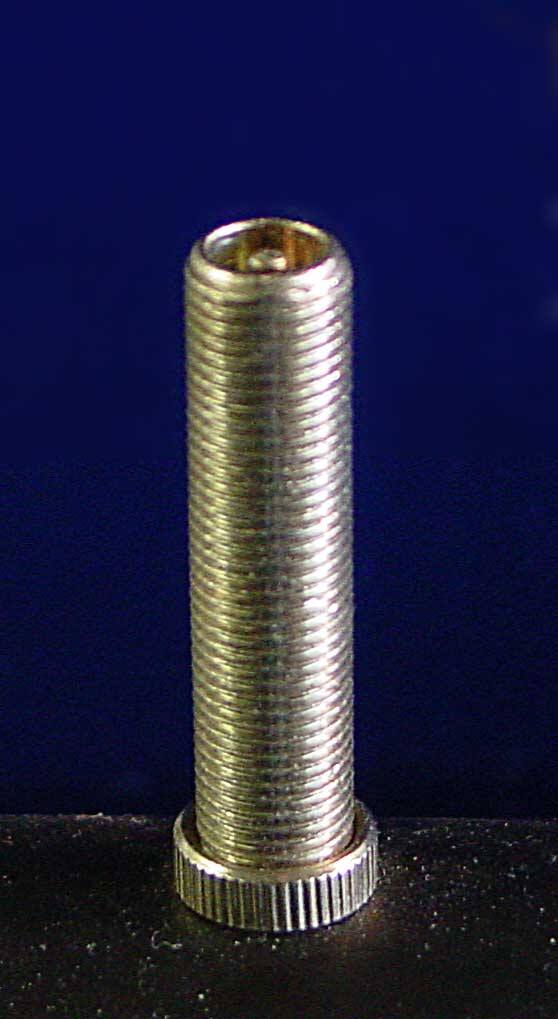
Schrader valve stem with valve core

There are three valves used on tires worldwide: Schrader valves, Presta valves, and Dunlop valves. Each goes by multiple names. Schrader valves are also known as American valves or car valves. Presta valves are also known as French valves, Sclaverand valves, and road bike valves. Dunlop valves are also known as German valves, English valves, Holland valves, Woods valves, flash valves, and alligator valves.

Schrader valves are almost universal on car, truck, and motorcycle tires worldwide. Presta and Dunlop valves are mostly found on bicycle tubes. Both the Schrader and the Presta types are effective for sealing high pressures. Their chief differences are that Schrader valves are larger and have springs that close the valve except when the pin is depressed. Schrader valves are used in a wide variety of compressed gas and pressurized liquid applications such as small torch and grill cylinders, and air shocks. Schrader valves are also viewed as more complex (requiring two seals over one). They weigh 4 to 5 grams (0.14 to 0.18 oz) more than Presta valves.

Schrader and Dunlop valve stems are 8 mm in diameter, whereas Presta valve stems are 6 mm, allowing Prestas to be used on narrower, high-performance rims as on road racing bicycles. Another disadvantage of the Schrader is that debris may be introduced into its spring-loaded pin, impairing inflation, whereas the Presta valve relies only on air pressure and a small knurled nut to keep it shut.

Inflating a bicycle tire equipped with a Presta or Dunlop valve at an automobile filling station requires an adaptor, while a Schrader-valved tube does not. Inflating at home or on the road requires either 6mm air chuck for Presta and Dunlop valves, or an 8mm chuck for Schrader valves. An important advantage of Schrader valves relative to Presta is that Schrader valves allow for quick air pressure checks. Some chucks have dual orifices to inflate all three.

== Dimensions ==
- External 8V1 thread: 0.305 in (7.747 mm) x 32 TPI (1/32 in or 0.7938 mm pitch; tap size 8v1-32)
- Internal 5V1 thread: 0.209 in (5.309 mm) x 36 TPI (1/36 in or 0.7056 mm pitch; tap size 5v1-36)

== See also ==
- Inner tube
- Valve stem
