= Inner tube =

Part of a tire

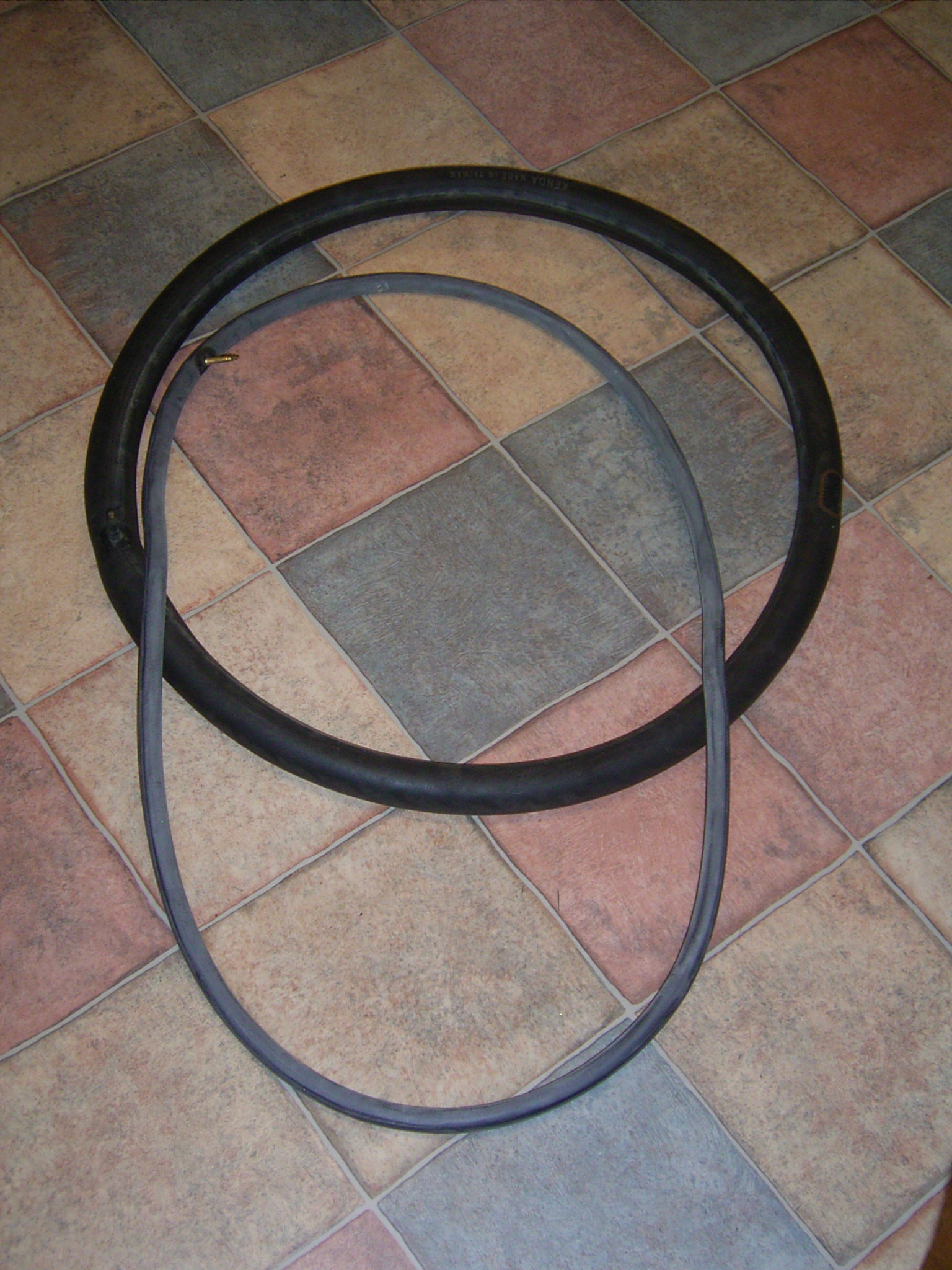
Two bicycle inner tubes: A larger mountain bike inner tube and a slimmer race bike tube.

An inner tube is an inflatable torus that forms the interior of some pneumatic tires. The tube is inflated through a valve stem and fits inside the tire casing. The inflated inner tube provides structural support and suspension, while the outer tire offers grip and protects the more fragile tube.

== Use ==
Nowadays, most bicycle tires use inner tubes. They are also used in items such as dolly carts, wheelbarrows, and many motorcycles. In the past, car tires used inner tubes, but most cars now use tubeless tires that hold air without an inner tube. Tubeless tires offer advantages, as they can operate at both low and high pressures without the risk of pinching or bursting, unlike tube tires. Large inner tubes are used for various recreational activities, such as flotation devices in tubing.

== History ==
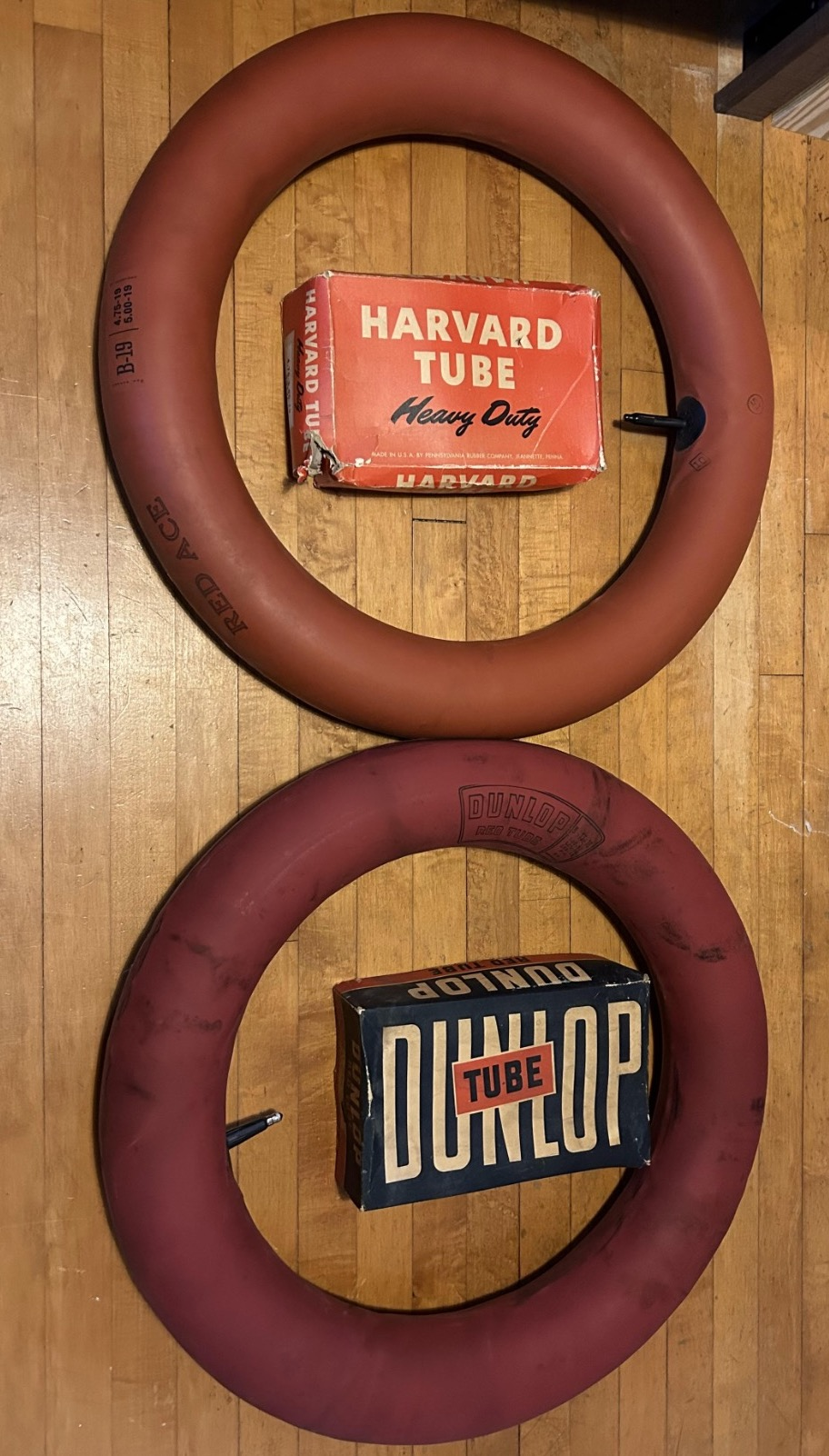
Two 1930s/1940s red inner tubes for car tires.

Inner tubes were invented in the 1800s for use with pneumatic tires, as standard wheels at the time were not air-filled, making them uncomfortable to ride on. Over the years, inner tubes were manufactured in various colors beyond the typical black, including red, white, and gray. These colored inner tubes were often made from more natural rubber compared to the standard vulcanized black tubes, making them more flexible. Inner tubes were used in tires for cars, trucks, and bicycles, but from the 1950s to the 1970s, tubeless tires began to dominate for cars and trucks.

== Material ==
Inner tubes are typically made from a mix of natural and synthetic rubber. Natural rubber is less prone to punctures and is often more pliable, while synthetic rubber is cheaper. Racing bikes often use inner tubes with a higher percentage of natural rubber compared to regular bikes. Some manufacturers have also developed other types of bike inner tubes, such as those made from latex and thermoplastic polyurethane (TPU).

== Performance ==
Inner tubes generally make tires slower than tubeless versions due to the friction between the casing and the inner tube. Tubes are often lighter on average, as they can be made relatively thin. However, latex and TPU inner tubes are designed to be lighter and more comfortable to ride on. Bead tires, whether with an inner tube or tubeless, cannot be ridden flat, as the tire may separate from the rim. In contrast, tubular tires have the tubing sewn to the tire, allowing them to be ridden flat if punctured. Tubeless tires are reported to be more comfortable if properly installed.

== See also ==
- Tubeless tires
