= Valve stem =

Type of valve

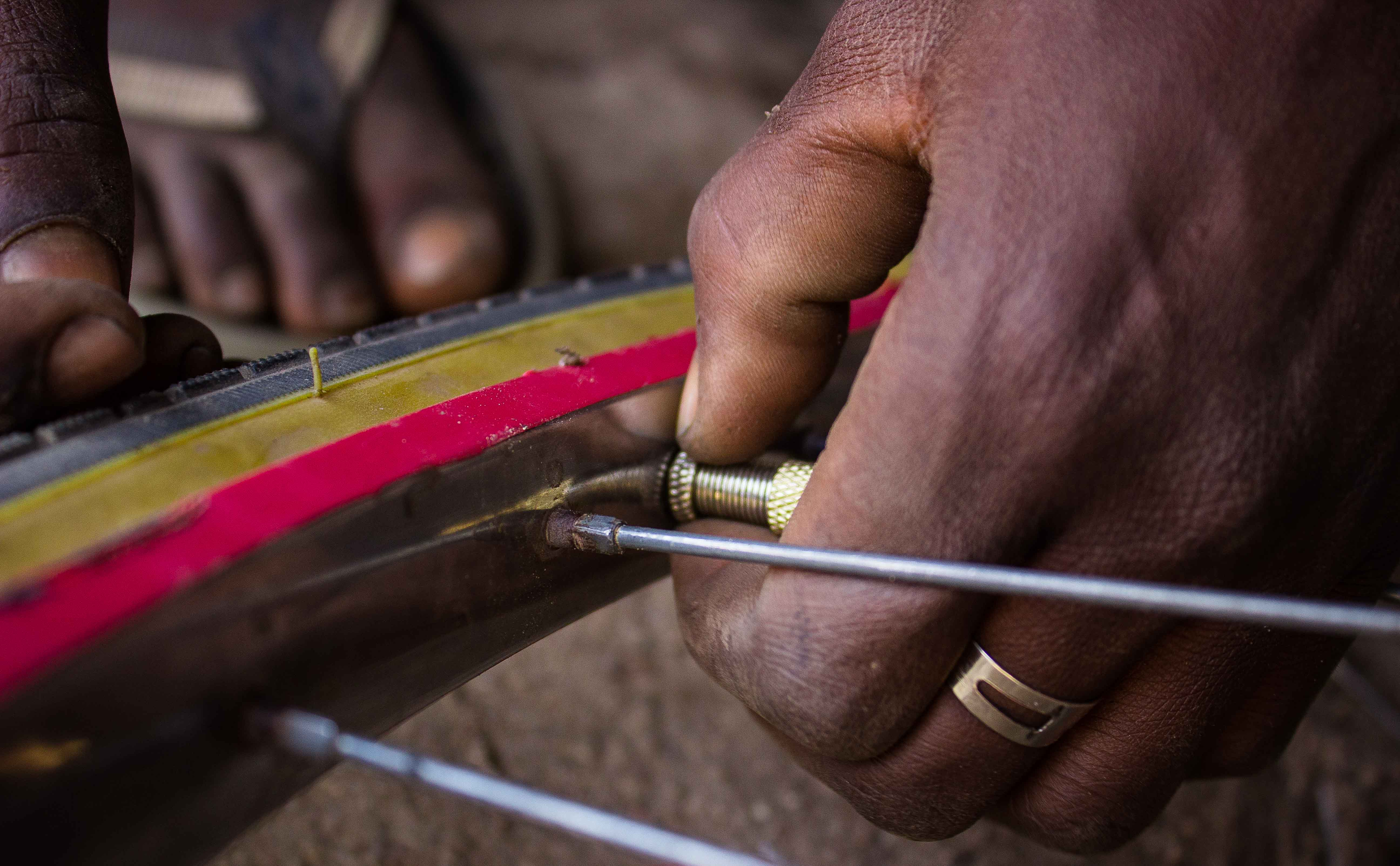
Replacing a valve stem.

A valve stem is a self-contained valve that opens to admit gas to a chamber (such as air to inflate a tire), and is then automatically closed and kept sealed by the pressure in the chamber, or a spring, or both, to prevent the gas from escaping.

There are many types of valves, and they are most commonly used on automobile, motorcycle, and bicycle tires, but also for many other applications. The most common type is the Schrader valve, but some road bicycles with skinny tires instead use the Presta valve.

== Schrader ==
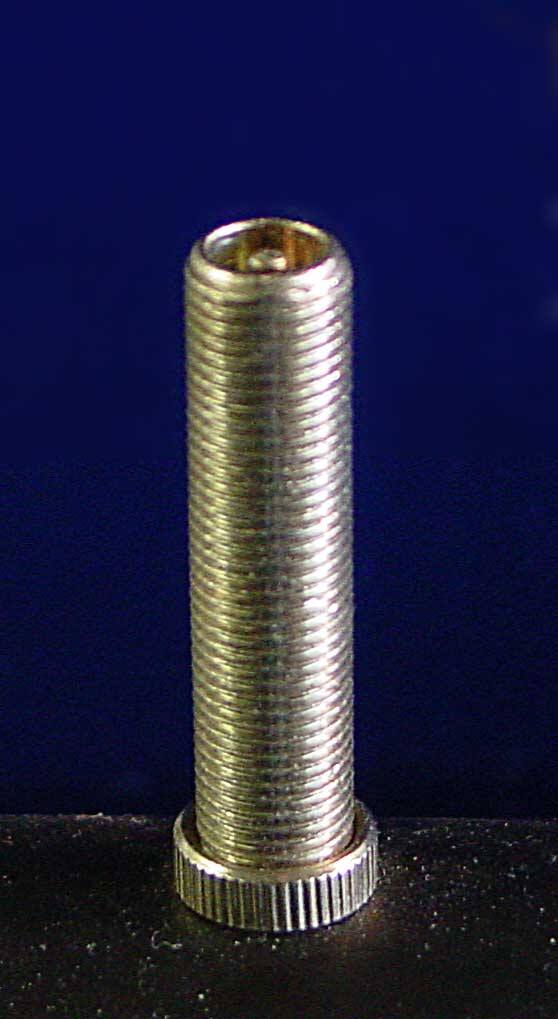
Schrader valve stem

Schrader valves consist of a valve stem into which a poppet valve is threaded with a spring attached. They are used on virtually all automobile and motorbike tires and on wider-rimmed bicycle tires. In addition to tires, Schrader valves of varying diameters are used in refrigeration and air conditioning systems, plumbing, engine fuel injection, suspension systems, and SCUBA regulators, allowing the user to remove and attach a hose while in use. The Schrader valves in the fuel injector rail of many automobiles are used as a quick and easy point to check fuel pressure or connect an injector cleaner cartridge.

== Presta ==
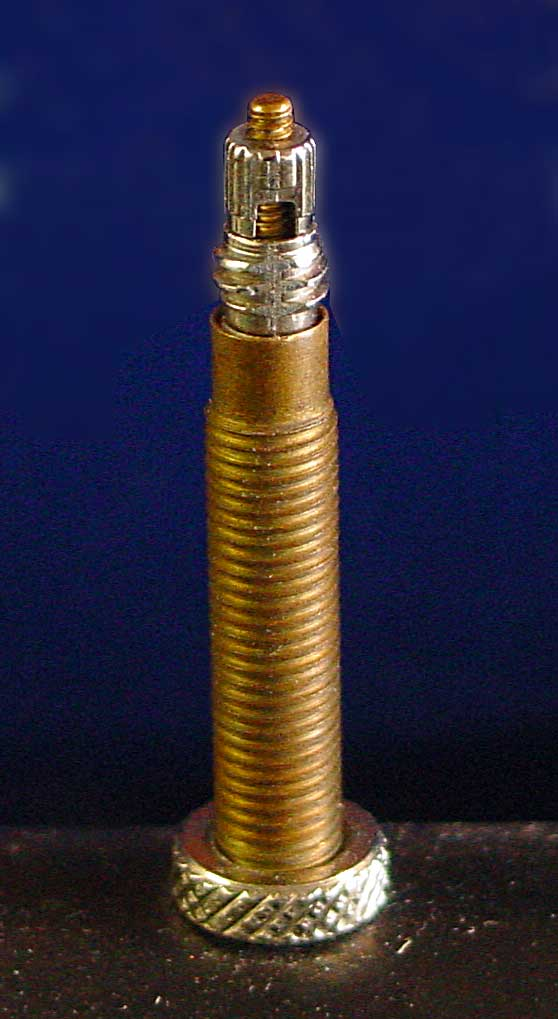
Presta valve stem

Presta valves (also called Sclaverand valves or French valves) are normally only used on bicycles. The stem has a narrower diameter (nominally 6 mm) than the thinnest (nominally 8 mm) Schrader type, and so the bore of the hole in the rim through which the stem passes can be smaller. Has a locknut that needs to be opened to inflate/deflate.

== Dunlop (or Woods) ==
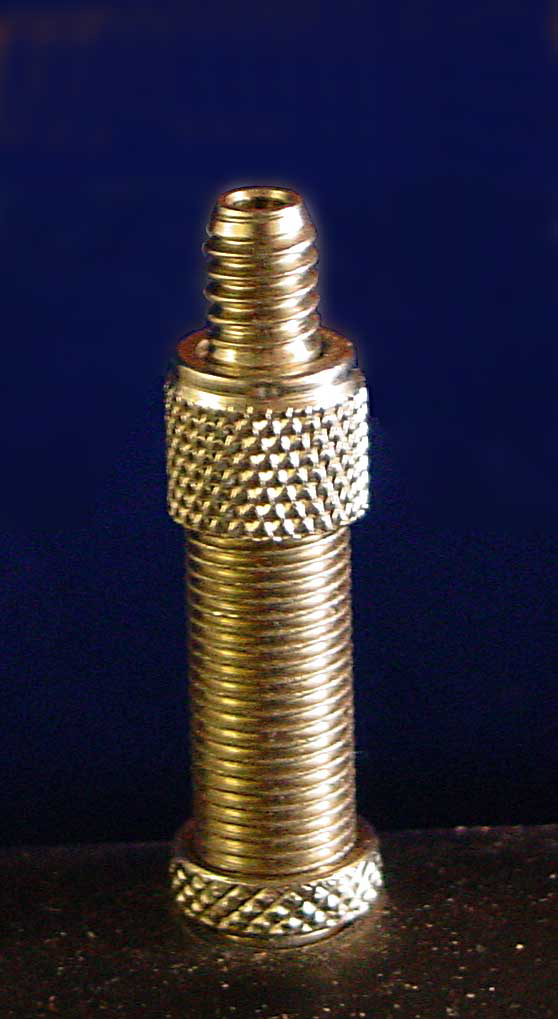
Dunlop (or Woods) valve stem

Dunlop valves (also called Woods valves or English valves) were the dominating bicycle valves in the European region and many other countries. As of 2021, Presta valves are just as common in these regions. Dunlop valves are still widely used especially on low to medium-priced bicycles (city and trekking bikes). They can be pumped up with a Presta bicycle pump.

== Regina ==
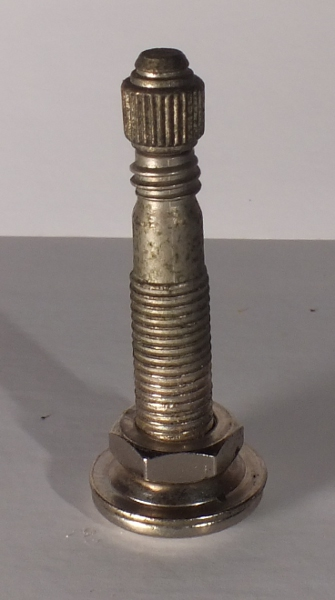
Regina Valve stem

The "Regina Valve" is very similar to the Presta and mostly used in Italy. The central threaded pin is so short that it does not protrude from the valve tube and therefore cannot be bent. In order to close the valve tightly, a small, loose nut is placed on this threaded rod with a diameter of only around 1.5 mm and screwed on by hand. A threaded rod is enough. By tightening the nut, the valve disc with the conical sealing body is pressed against the valve seat.

Rim drilling:⌀ 6.5 mm

Thread DIN 7756 • outside VG 6×32 •outside VG 5.2×24 at the upper end

Maximum pressure 15 bars.

== Others ==
Many other valves are used only in certain regions or for limited purposes.

Invisible tire valves are different in design from traditional tire valves. An inflator stem is not used; instead, a removable cap on a valve stem embedded in the tire rim is fitted, with only the cap visible. When inflating the tire, the cap is first removed, typically with a coin, and then a "portable" dedicated inflator stem is screwed onto the valve stem. Through the inflator, the tire is inflated as usual.
