= Tire maintenance =

Maintenance of motor vehicle tires

Inspection and maintenance of tires is about inspecting for wear and damage on tires so that adjustments or measures can be made to take better care of the tires so that they last longer, or to detect or predict if repairs or replacement of the tires becomes necessary. Tire maintenance for motor vehicles is based on several factors. The chief reason for tire replacement is friction from moving contact with road surfaces, causing the tread on the outer perimeter of tires to eventually wear away. When the tread depth becomes too shallow, like for example below 3.2 mm (4/32 in), the tire is worn out and should be replaced. The same rims can usually be used throughout the lifetime of the car. Other problems encountered in tire maintenance include:

- Uneven or accelerated tire wear: can be caused by under-inflation, overloading or poor wheel alignment.
- Increased tread wear on only one side of a tire: often a sign of poor wheel alignment.
- Tread worn away completely: especially when the wear on the outer rubber exposes the reinforcing threads within, the tire is said to be bald and must be replaced as soon as possible. Sometimes tires with worn tread are recapped, i.e. a new layer of rubber with grooves is bonded onto the outer perimeter of a worn tire. Since this bonding may occasionally come loose, new tires are considered superior to recapped ones.

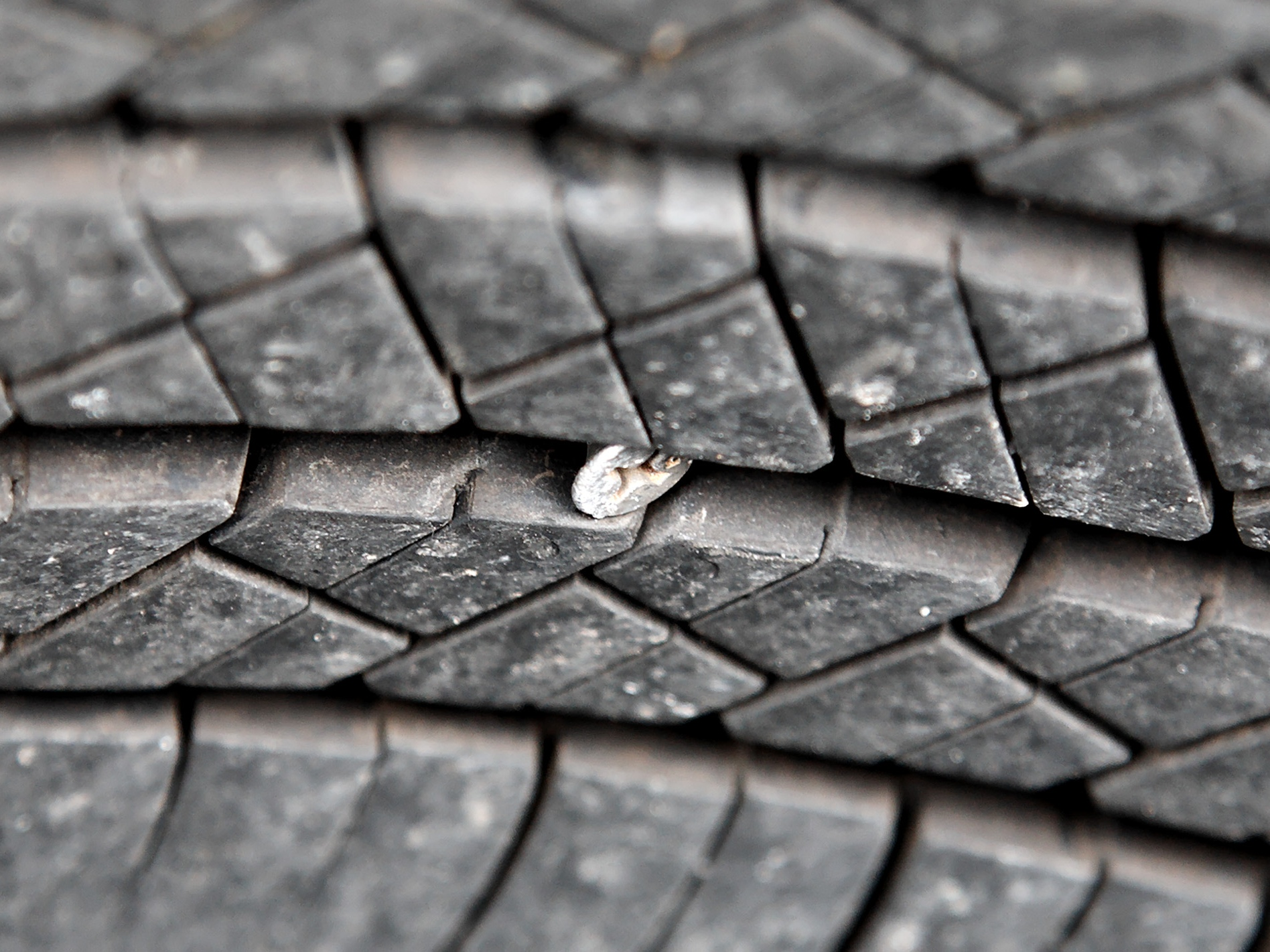
This tire has been punctured by a screw.

Finding a leak with soapy water

Sometimes a pneumatic tire gets a hole or a leak through which the air inside leaks out resulting in a flat tire, a condition which must be fixed before the car can be driven safely.

== Spare tires ==
Vehicles typically carry a spare tire, already mounted on a wheel rim, to be used in the event of a flat tire or blowout. Spare tires (sometimes called "doughnuts") for modern cars are smaller than regular tires (to save trunk space, weight and cost) and should not be used to drive very far before replacement with a full-size tire. A few vehicle models use conventional size spare tires. Jacks and lug wrenches for emergency replacement of a flat tire with a spare are included with a new car. Not included, but available separately, are hand or foot pumps (like a bicycle pump) for filling a tire with air by the vehicle owner. Cans of pressurized air can sometimes be bought separately for convenient emergency refill of a tire.

Some cars and trucks are equipped with run flat tires that may be driven with a puncture over a distance of 80 km to 100 km. This eliminates the need for an immediate stop and tire change or calling for roadside assistance.

=== Racing tires ===
On dry surfaces, tires have more traction when they are bald, because there is more surface area making contact with the road. The reason regular tires have treads is to avoid hydroplaning when the surface of the road is wet. Therefore, racing cars competing in dry conditions characteristically use tires without treads, often known as slicks. For example, stock cars driven on professionally maintained NASCAR tracks use tires without treads, and with a thicker layer of rubber.

== Rotation ==
Front tires, especially on front wheel drive vehicles, have a tendency to wear out more quickly than rear tires. Routine maintenance including tire rotation (exchanging the front and rear tires with each other) is often done periodically to facilitate uniform tire wear.

== Inflation (adding air) ==
There are simple hand-held tire-pressure gauges which can be temporarily attached to the valve stem to check a tire's interior air pressure. This measurement of tire inflation pressure should be made at least once a month. Since heat in the tires from driving can impact the temperature a lot, accurate readings can only be obtained when the tires are cold - that is at least three hours after the vehicle has been driven or driven less than 1 km (1/2 mi) since cold - tire pressures will not then be higher because of operating heat. The recommended inflation pressure is found in the owner's manual and on the vehicle's tire placard. Because of slow air leaks, changes in the weather and ambient temperature or other conditions, tire pressure will occasionally have to be corrected via the valve stem with compressed air which is often available at service stations.

Under-inflation of tires can cause premature and uneven tire wear, excess fuel usage, and carries an increased risk of explosive failure (blowout) especially after prolonged high speed operation at high temperatures. Overall, these factors decrease the life of a tire by up to 20%. Many vehicles have tire pressure monitoring systems; older cars are usually equipped with indirect monitoring systems while later cars are typically equipped with direct tire pressure monitoring systems.

== Tire safety ==
It is extremely important for owners to have an understanding of what is safe and what is not when it comes to their tires. The three major areas to keep an eye on is the tread, sidewall, and air pressure of the tire. Having the correct air pressure in your vehicle's tires lets your vehicle perform in the most efficient way possible. When objects such as a screw or nail puncture a tire, it creates a small leak in the tire. This leads to under-inflation of the tire. When a tire is under-inflated, it causes the inside of the tire to heat up. This heat compromises the internal structure of the tire which can lead to a blowout. When a tire is over-inflated, it wears the tread down faster, and becomes more prone to catching nails or screws in the tire. The best way to check tire maintenance is to check the air pressure, because that will lead you to whatever problem your tire might have. There are several factors that may cause quicker tire wear, among them there are heavy braking and fast cornering, constant heavy cargo transportation and rough roads, improper pressure (under- or overinflation) as the tire with low pressure cause the tire wear from the tires edges while the tire with high pressure cause the tire wear from the central part of the tire.also improper maintenance like improper tire alignment and balance cause the tire wear from one side and wearing patches along the tire. all this diffenrent types of tire wearing are called uneven tire wear pattern. That's why for the older vehicles, that do not come equipped with TPMS sensors, it is highly recommended to check tire pressure at least once a month (National Highway Traffic Safety Administration recommendation). After How Many Kilometers To Change Car Tyres (Must Know to avoid accident and incident).

== See also ==
- Tire-pressure gauge
- Tire-pressure monitoring system
