= Nira =

Nira or NIRA may refer to:

== Nira ==
- Neera (given name)
- Nira Radia, Indian lobbyist
  - Nira Radia tapes controversy
- Shivatkar (Nira), a town in southwestern Maharashtra state in India
- Nira, a village in Israel, today part of Beit Yitzhak-Sha'ar Hefer
- Nira, a diminutive of the Russian female first name Avenira
- Nira Juanco, Spanish sports journalist and television presenter
- Nira Dyn, Israeli mathematician
- The Japanese term for garlic chives

== NIRA ==
- NIRA Dynamics AB, a Swedish automotive company
- National Identification and Registration Authority
- National Industrial Recovery Act of 1933, in USA
- National Institute for Research Advancement, a Japanese independent policy research think tank
- National Intercollegiate Rodeo Association
- National Intercollegiate Rugby Association
- New Irish Republican Army, an Irish Republican militia group
- Nigeria Internet Registration Association
- NIRA Intense Import Drag Racing, a 1999 video game
