= Nira Dynamics AB =

Automotive research company

NIRA Dynamics AB
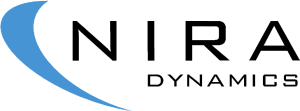
- Company type: Company limited by shares
- Industry: Automotive
- Founded: 2001
- Headquarters: Linköping, Sweden
- Key people: Lisa Åbom (CEO)
- Products: Tire-pressure monitoring systems Sensor fusion systems Automotive safety systems
- Revenue: € 22.9 million (2019)
- Number of employees: 120 (2021)
- Website: niradynamics.se

NIRA Dynamics AB is a Swedish software company specializing in sensor fusion and signal processing for the automotive industry and road intelligence applications. Founded in 2001 and headquartered in Linköping, Sweden, the company develops software-based systems that enhance vehicle safety, tire monitoring, and road surface analysis.

NIRA supplies automotive original equipment manufacturers (OEMs) and suppliers in Europe, North America, Latin America, and Asia. Its technologies are deployed in millions of vehicles worldwide and are used by several global automotive manufacturers. The company focuses on extracting new functionality from existing vehicle sensors, enabling cost-efficient and scalable solutions without additional hardware.

One of NIRA’s main products, Tire Pressure Indicator (TPI), a software-based tire pressure monitoring system (TPMS), has been implemented in more than 100 million vehicles globally.

== History ==
NIRA was founded in 2001 and is located at Mjärdevi Science Park in Linköping, Sweden.

During the early period, NIRA Dynamics developed the first two of its products: the anti-spin system NSC and a positioning system MAP. NSC received the Volvo Technology Award and until 2004 was featured in the Volvo S40 and V40 models under the name DSA (Dynamic Stability Assistance). Since 2007, NSC is in series production and featured in a line of motorcycles from one of the world leading motorcycle manufacturers.

In 2008, the company’s Tire Pressure Indicator (TPI) received the Frost & Sullivan European Automotive Chassis Product of the Year Award.

During the 2010s, NIRA expanded its portfolio to include road surface estimation and tire grip monitoring technologies. From 2017, the company began operating in the road maintenance sector, providing road condition data services, including Winter Road Insights and Road Health, to municipalities, road authorities, and infrastructure operators.

Since 2020, NIRA has collected road surface data from connected passenger vehicles to support driver information systems, vehicle functions, and road maintenance planning. In 2020, the company launched Road Surface Alerts in collaboration with the Volkswagen Group, enabling vehicles to issue warnings about slippery road conditions.

NIRA Dynamics holds an ISO 9001:2000 certificate stating that it has efficient and structured processes and tools to manage collaborative development projects in international environments.

== Technology ==
NIRA Dynamics develops software-based systems built on sensor fusion and signal processing. The company’s technology combines data from multiple vehicle sensors, including wheel speed signals from anti-lock braking system (ABS) and electronic stability control(ESC), to generate virtual sensor outputs. These estimations enable functions such as tire pressure monitoring and road surface friction assessment without requiring dedicated hardware.

By using existing vehicle sensors, NIRA’s approach allows manufacturers to introduce additional safety and monitoring functions without increasing sensor count or system complexity. The software is embedded in vehicle electronic control units (ECUs) and operates during normal driving.

In addition to in-vehicle functionality, NIRA aggregates anonymized data from connected vehicle fleets to analyze road surface conditions at scale. By combining estimated friction and other road condition parameters with environmental data, the company generates digital road condition models used in driver information systems and road maintenance operations.

== Products ==
NIRA Dynamics' core product is its Tire Pressure Indicator (TPI), an indirect tire-pressure monitoring system (TPMS) capable of detecting underinflation simultaneously in up to four tires. At the moment, TPI is installed in several Audi models (the A1, A3, A4, A5, A6, A7, A8, Q3, Q5, Q7, TT and many more); several Volkswagen models (Polo, Golf, Jetta, Beetle, Scirocco, Passat, Tiguan, Touran, Sharan and many more); several SEAT and Skoda models; as well as the Chery Arrizo 7 and the MG 3. It is also fitted to many Volvo, Fiat and Renault vehicles.

Unlike direct TPMS solutions that rely on in-wheel pressure sensors and radio-frequency (RF) communication, TPI estimates tire inflation levels using wheel speed signals from the vehicle’s anti-lock braking system (ABS) and electronic stability control (ESC) system. The system uses relative rolling radius and wheel dynamics to detect pressure deviations in one or more tires and performs an automatic calibration after a driver-initiated reset. Because it does not require additional hardware, TPI can be integrated into existing electronic control units and is AUTOSAR-compliant.

TPI complies with international tire pressure monitoring regulations, including the European ECE R64 regulation and the United States Federal Motor Vehicle Safety Standard (FMVSS) No. 138.

Loose Wheel Indicator (LWI) is a wheel monitoring system that detects when wheel bolts or nuts loosen and the wheel begins to separate from the hub. By analyzing wheel speed signals from the vehicle’s existing sensors, the system identifies the affected wheel position and warns the driver before detachment occurs.

Tire Grip Indicator (TGI) constantly estimates the available friction between the tire and the road surface. By analyzing wheel speed signals and other vehicle sensor data, the system calculates real-time friction levels under normal driving conditions, without requiring additional sensors. TGI can provide grip information to support driver assistance and vehicle control systems.

Tread Wear Indicator (TWI) estimates tire tread wear using data from existing vehicle sensors. By analyzing vehicle sensor data over time, the system monitors changes in tire characteristics and detects wear patterns without requiring additional hardware. TWI can provide driver notifications and support tire maintenance planning for individual vehicles and fleet operations.

Road Surface Alerts (RSA) is a connected vehicle service that provides location-specific warnings about hazardous road conditions based on aggregated vehicle data. By analyzing how vehicles interact with the road surface, the system detects conditions such as low friction or surface irregularities and generates real-time alerts for drivers approaching affected areas. RSA can be integrated into in-vehicle infotainment systems, navigation platforms, and automotive software environments.

Road Surface Conditions (RSC) is a connected data service that provides real-time information about road grip and surface conditions by combining data from connected vehicles with external sources such as RWIS and weather data. The system supports advanced driver-assistance systems (ADAS), including functions associated with SAE level 2 and higher automation.

Road Maintenance solutions:

NIRA Dynamics provides connected vehicle–based road condition data to support road maintenance and infrastructure management. By aggregating anonymized vehicle sensor data with external sources, the company generates road condition insights used for operational decision-making and long-term planning.

Road Health is a road monitoring service that analyzes parameters such as road roughness, friction, and surface irregularities using high-frequency vehicle data. The system enables continuous assessment of road networks and supports maintenance planning by identifying areas affected by wear or damage.

Winter Road Insights (WRI) is a connected vehicle–based road condition monitoring service focused on winter operations. By aggregating friction and related road surface data from vehicle fleets, WRI provides real-time information on slippery or changing road conditions to support winter maintenance planning and quality assurance of performed measures.

== See also ==
- Blowout (tire)
- Tire maintenance
- Tire uniformity
