= Dustcap =

A dustcap is a small cover used on the valve stem of a bicycle or car tire to prevent dust or other small particles from entering the valve and damaging it. Dustcaps are usually made from plastic but may occasionally be made of metal. The dustcap is internally threaded and is secured by screwing it onto the end of the stem. To prevent corrosion due to electrolysis and malfunction of the electronics in a direct TPMS and avoid costly repairs, metal valve caps without insulating plastic linings should not be used on direct-TPMS-equipped tire valve stems.

A dustcap may also refer, on a bicycle, to the crankarm bolt cover. It is usually a piece of metal or plastic that, on the crankarm, is snapped or screwed into the threaded counterbore, which houses the bolt that holds the crankarm to its axle, the bottom bracket spindle. The dustcap serves to protect the threads (on the inside of the counterbore), which are used with a crankarm puller to remove the crankarm from the spindle.

A dustcap may also refer, on a bicycle, to the metal ring that covers the bearings in a cup-and-cone ball-bearing hubset.

== See also ==
- Car bra
- Bicycle wheel
