= Tire-pressure monitoring system =

Electronic system in vehicles

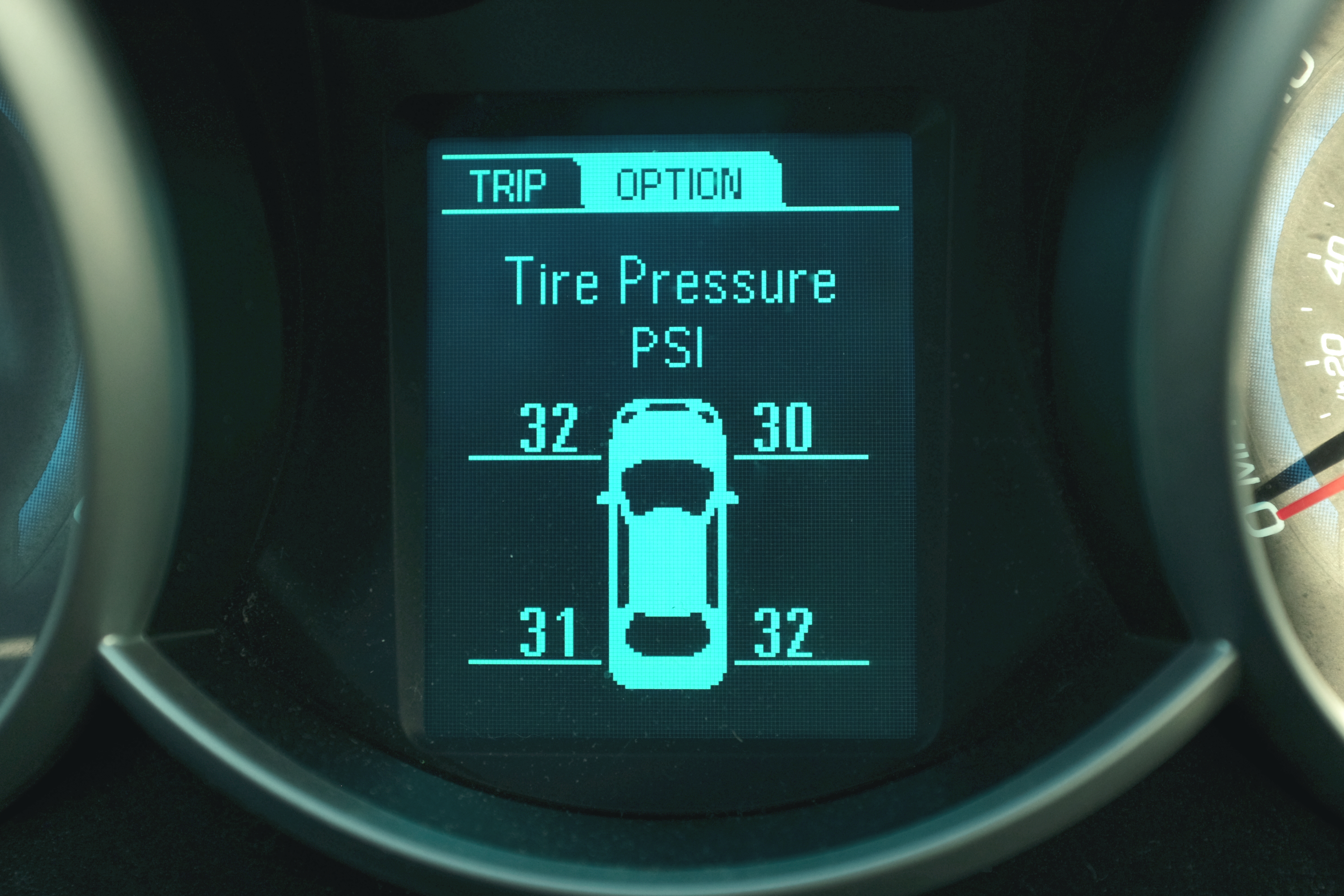
Driver Information Center in a 2013 Chevrolet Cruze showing TPMS readout

A tire-pressure monitoring system (TPMS) monitors the air pressure inside the pneumatic tires on vehicles. A TPMS reports real-time tire-pressure information to the driver, using either a gauge, a pictogram display, or a simple low-pressure warning light. TPMS can be divided into two different types – direct (dTPMS) and indirect (iTPMS).

TPMS are installed either when the vehicle is made or after the vehicle is put to use. The goal of a TPMS is avoiding traffic accidents, poor fuel economy, and increased tire wear due to under-inflated tires through early recognition of a hazardous state of the tires. This functionality first appeared in luxury vehicles in Europe in the 1980s, while mass-market adoption followed the USA passing the 2000 TREAD Act after the Firestone and Ford tire controversy.

Mandates for TPMS technology in new cars have continued to proliferate in the 21st century in Russia, the EU, Japan, South Korea and many other Asian countries. From November 2014 TPMS was mandatory for new vehicles in the European Union; in a survey carried out between November 2016 and August 2017, 54% of passenger cars in Sweden, Germany, and Spain were found not to have TPMS, a figure believed to be an under-estimate.

Aftermarket valve cap-based dTPMS systems, which require a smartphone and an app or portable display unit, are also available for bicycles, automobiles, and trailers.

== History ==
=== Initial adoption ===
Due to the influence tire pressure has on vehicle safety and efficiency, tire-pressure monitoring (TPM) was adopted by the European market as an optional feature for luxury passenger vehicles in the 1980s. The first passenger vehicle to adopt TPM was the Porsche 959 in 1986, using a hollow spoke wheel system developed by PSK. In 1996 Renault used the Michelin PAX system for the Scenic and in 1999 PSA Peugeot Citroën decided to adopt TPM as a standard feature on the Peugeot 607. The following year (2000), Renault launched the Laguna II, the first high volume mid-size passenger vehicle in the world to be equipped with TPM as a standard feature.

In the United States, TPM was introduced by General Motors for the 1991 model year for the Corvette in conjunction with Goodyear run-flat tires. The system uses sensors in the wheels and a driver display which can show tire pressure at any wheel, plus warnings for both high and low pressure. It has been standard on Corvettes ever since.

=== Firestone recall and legal mandates ===
The Firestone recall in the late 1990s (which was linked to more than 100 deaths from rollovers following tire tread-separation), pushed the United States Congress to legislate the TREAD Act. The Act mandated the use of a suitable TPMS technology in all light motor vehicles (under 10,000 lb (4,500 kg)), to help alert drivers of under-inflation events.

This act affects all U.S. light motor vehicles sold after September 1, 2007. Phase-in started in October 2005 at 20%, and reached 100% for models produced after September 2007.

In the United States, as of 2008 and the European Union, as of November 1, 2012, all new passenger car models (M1) released must be equipped with a TPMS. From November 1, 2014, all new passenger cars sold in the European Union must be equipped with a TPMS. For N1 vehicles (trucks up to 3.5 tonnes), TPMS are not mandatory, but if a TPMS is fitted, it must comply with the regulation.

On July 13, 2010, the South Korean Ministry of Land, Transport and Maritime Affairs announced a pending partial-revision to the Korea Motor Vehicle Safety Standards (KMVSS), specifying that "TPMS shall be installed to passenger vehicles and vehicles of GVW 3.5 tons or less, ... [effective] on January 1, 2013 for new models and on June 30, 2014 for existing models". Japan is expected to adopt European Union legislation approximately one year after European Union implementation. Further countries to make TPMS mandatory include Russia, Indonesia, the Philippines, Israel, Malaysia and Turkey. After the TREAD Act was passed, many companies responded to the market opportunity by releasing TPMS products using battery-powered radio transmitter wheel modules.

=== Run-flat tires ===
The introduction of run-flat tires and emergency spare tires by several tire and vehicle manufacturers has provided motivation to make at least some basic TPMS mandatory when using run-flat tires. With run-flat tires, the driver will most likely not notice that a tire is running flat, hence the so-called "run-flat warning systems" were introduced. These are most often first generation, purely roll-radius based iTPMS, which ensure that run-flat tires are not used beyond their limitations, usually 80 km/h (50 mph) and 80 km (50 miles) driving distance. The iTPMS market has progressed as well. Indirect TPMS are able to detect under-inflation through combined use of roll radius and spectrum analysis and hence four-wheel monitoring has become feasible. With this breakthrough, meeting the legal requirements is possible also with iTPMS.

== Direct versus indirect ==
=== Indirect TPMS ===
Indirect TPMS (iTPMS) systems do not use physical pressure sensors; they measure air pressures using software-based systems, which by evaluating and combining existing sensor signals such as wheel speeds, accelerometers, and driveline data to estimate and monitor the tire pressure without physical pressure sensors in the wheels. First-generation iTPMS systems are based on the principle that under-inflated tires have a slightly smaller diameter (and hence higher angular velocity) than a correctly inflated one. These differences are measurable through the wheel speed sensors of ABS/ESC systems. Second generation iTPMS can also detect simultaneous under-inflation in up to all four tires using spectrum analysis of individual wheels, which can be realized in software using advanced signal processing techniques.

iTPMS systems are sometimes referred to by other names, such as Ford's ‘Deflation Detection System (DDS)’ or Honda's ‘Deflation Warning System (DWS)’.

iTPMS cannot measure or display absolute pressure values; they are relative by nature and have to be reset by the driver once the tires are checked and all pressures adjusted correctly. The reset is normally done either by a physical button or in a menu of the on-board computer. iTPMS are, compared to dTPMS, more sensitive to the influences of different tires and external influences like road surfaces and driving speed or style. The reset procedure, followed by an automatic learning phase of typically 20 to 60 minutes of driving under which the iTPMS learns and stores the reference parameters before it becomes fully active, cancels out many, but not all of these. As iTPMS do not involve any additional hardware, spare parts, electronic/toxic waste, or service (beyond the regular reset), they are regarded as easy to handle and customer-friendly. As mentioned, however, the sensors must be reset every time changes are done to the tire setup, and some consumers do not wish to have this added responsibility.

Since factory installation of TPMS became mandatory in November 2014 for all new passenger vehicles in the EU, various iTPMS have been type-approved according to UN Regulation R64. Examples for this are most of the VW group models, but also numerous Honda, Volvo, Opel, Ford, Mazda, PSA, FIAT and Renault models. iTPMS are quickly gaining market shares in the EU and are expected to become the dominating TPMS technology in the near future.

iTPMS are regarded as less accurate by some due to their nature—given that simple ambient temperature variations can lead to pressure variations of the same magnitude as the legal detection thresholds— but many vehicle manufacturers and customers value the ease of use.

=== Direct TPMS ===
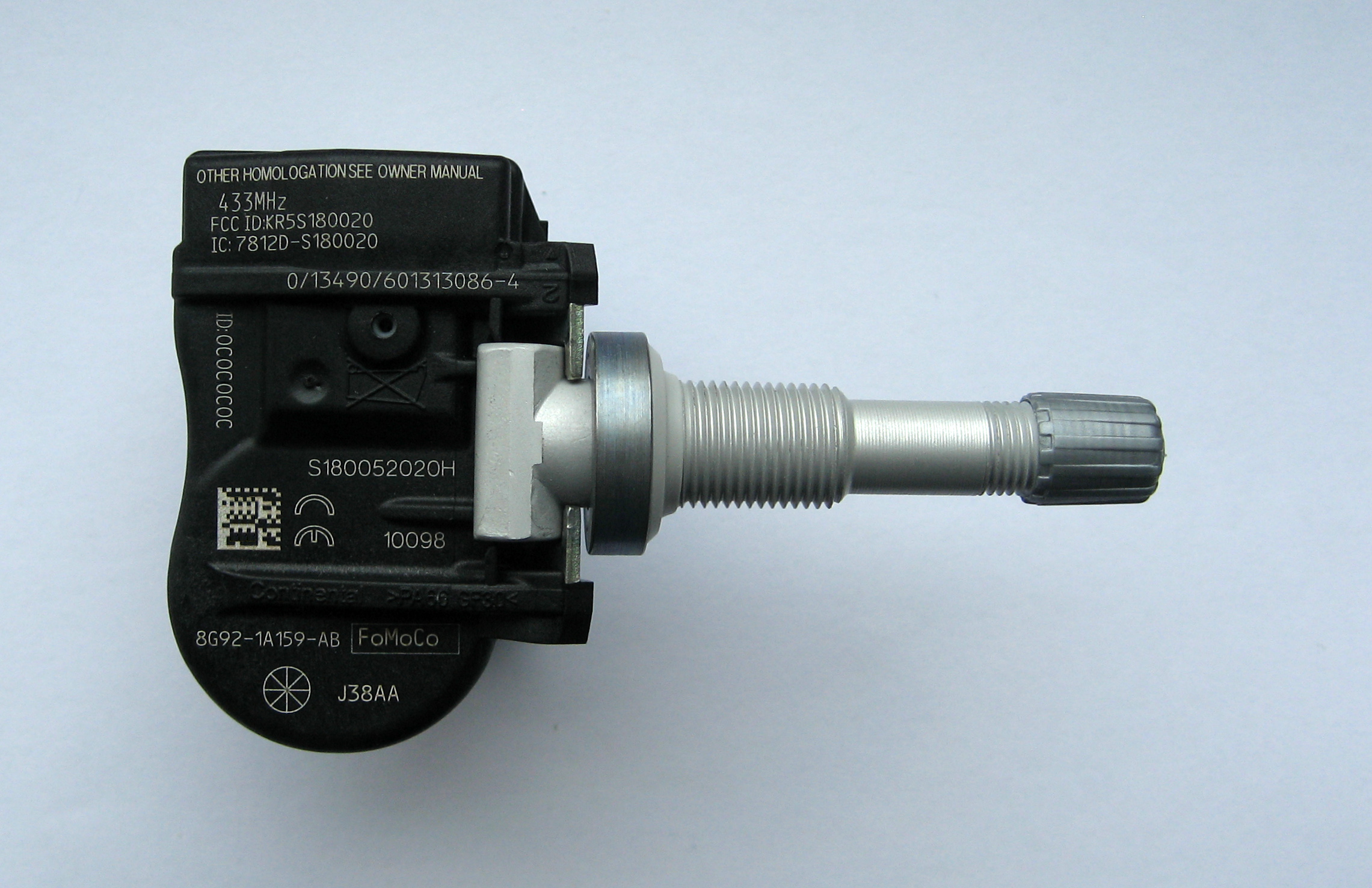
direct TPM sensor fitted in valve system, manufacturer VDO

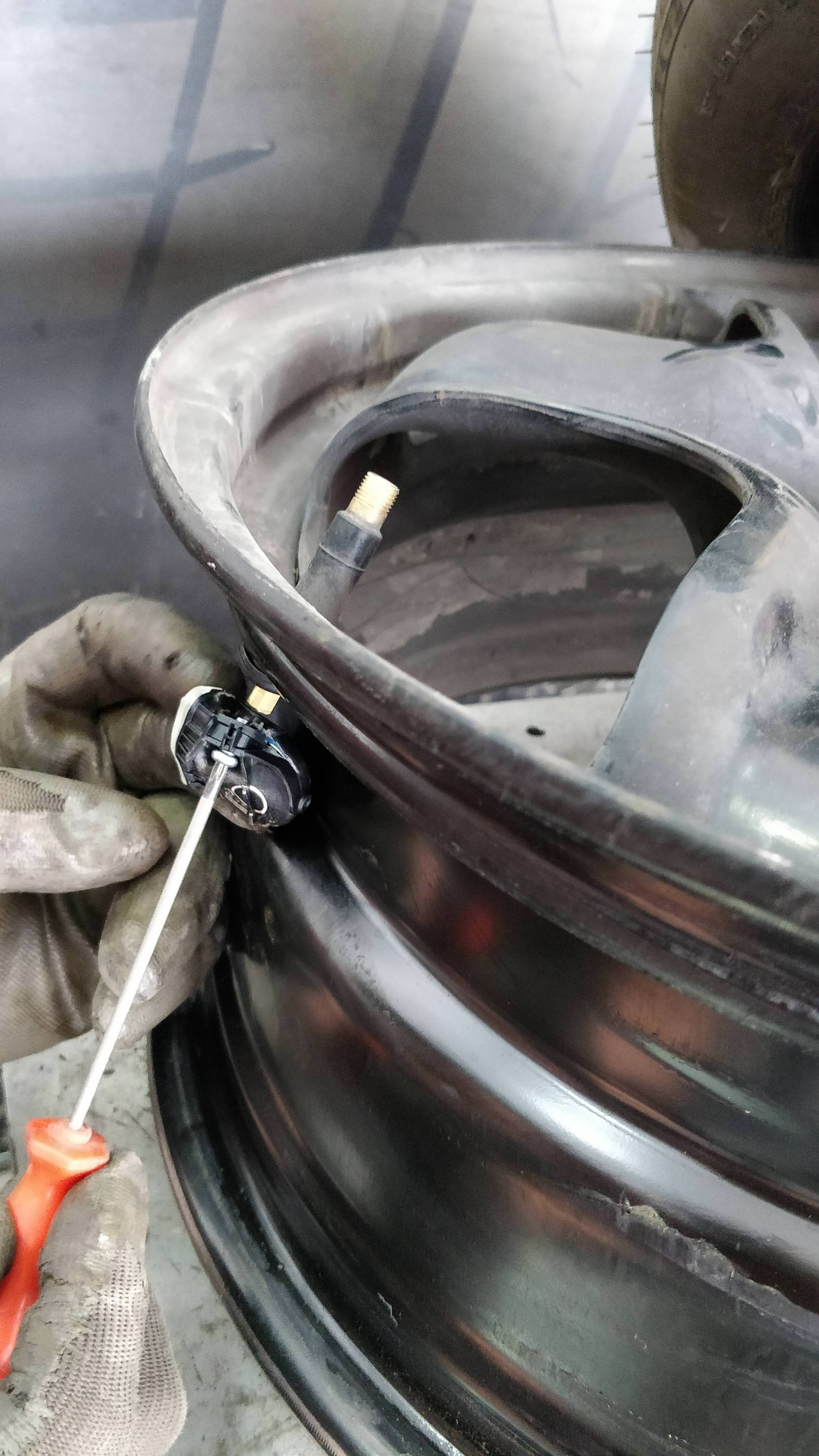
A damaged direct TPMS sensor being removed

Direct TPMS (dTPMS) directly measures tire pressure using hardware sensors. In each wheel, most often on the inside of the valve, there is a battery-driven pressure sensor which transfers pressure information to a central control unit which reports it to the vehicle's onboard computer. Some units also measure and alert temperatures of the tire as well. These systems can identify under-inflation for each individual tire. Although the systems vary in transmitting options, many TPMS products (both OEM and aftermarket) can display realtime, individual tire pressures whether the vehicle is moving or parked. There are many different solutions, but all of them have to face the problems of exposure to hostile environments. The majority are powered by batteries, which limit their useful life. Some sensors utilise a wireless power system similar to that used in RFID tag reading which solves the problem of limited battery life. This also increases the frequency of data transmission up to 40 Hz and reduces the sensor weight, which can be important in motorsport applications. If the sensors are mounted on the outside of the wheel, as are some aftermarket systems, they are subject to mechanical damage, aggressive fluids, and theft. When mounted on the inside of the rim, they are no longer easily accessible for battery change and the RF link must overcome the attenuating effects of the tire, which increases the energy need.

A direct TPMS sensor consists of the following main functions requiring only a few external components — e.g. battery, housing, PCB — to get the sensor module that is mounted to the valve stem inside the tire:

- pressure sensor;
- analog-digital converter;
- microcontroller;
- system controller;
- oscillator;
- radio frequency transmitter;
- low frequency receiver, and
- voltage regulator (battery management).

Most originally fitted dTPMS have the sensor mounted on the inside of the rim and the batteries are not exchangeable. A discharged battery means that the tire must be dismounted in order to replace it, so long battery life is desirable. To save energy and prolong battery life, many dTPMS sensors do not transmit information when parked (which eliminates spare tire monitoring) or apply a more power-expensive two-way communication which enables wake-up of the sensor. For OEM auto dTPMS units to work properly, they need to recognize the sensor positions and must ignore the signals from other vehicles.

Aftermarket dTPMS units not only transmit while vehicles are moving or parked, but also provide users with some advanced monitoring options including data logging, remote monitoring options and more. They are available for all types of vehicles, from motorcycles to heavy equipment, and can monitor up to 64 tires at a time, which is important for commercial vehicles. Many aftermarket dTPMS units do not require specialized tools to program or reset, making them much simpler to use.

== Maintenance issues ==
=== Valve-stem corrosion ===
The first generation of TPMS sensors that are integral with the valve stem can suffer from corrosion. Metallic valve caps can become seized to their valve stems due to galvanic corrosion and efforts to remove these caps can break the stem, destroying the sensor. A similar fate may befall aftermarket brass valve cores installed in their stems by an unwary technician, replacing the original specialized nickel-coated cores. Seizure to the valve stem can complicate the repair of a tire leak, possibly requiring replacement of the sensor.

=== Tire sealant compatibility ===
There is controversy regarding the compatibility of after-market tire sealants with dTPMS that employ sensors mounted inside the tire. Some manufacturers of sealants assert that their products are indeed compatible, but others warn that the "sealant may come in contact with the sensor in a way that renders the sensor temporarily inoperable until it is properly cleaned, inspected and re-installed by a tire care professional". Such doubts are also reported by others. Use of such sealants may void the TPMS sensor warranty.

== Benefits of TPMS ==
The dynamic behavior of a pneumatic tire is closely connected to its inflation pressure. Key factors like braking distance and lateral stability require the inflation pressures to be adjusted and kept as specified by the vehicle manufacturer. Extreme under-inflation can even lead to thermal and mechanical overload caused by overheating and subsequent, sudden destruction of the tire itself. Additionally, fuel efficiency and tire wear are severely affected by under-inflation. Tires do not only leak air if punctured, they also leak air naturally, and over a year, even a typical new, properly mounted tire can lose from 20 to 60 kPa (3 to 9 psi), roughly 10% or even more of its initial pressure.

The significant advantages of TPMS are summarized as follows:

- Fuel savings: According to the GITI, for every 10% of under-inflation on each tire on a vehicle, a 1% reduction in fuel economy will occur. In the United States alone, the Department of Transportation estimates that under inflated tires waste 2 billion US gallons (7,600,000 m^{3}) of fuel each year.
- Extended tire life: Under inflated tires are the number one cause of tire failure and contribute to tire disintegration, heat buildup, ply separation and sidewall/casing breakdowns. Further, a difference of 10 pounds per square inch (69 kPa; 0.69 bar) in pressure on a set of duals literally drags the lower pressured tire 2.5 metres per kilometre (13 feet per mile). Moreover, running a tire even briefly on inadequate pressure breaks down the casing and prevents the ability to retread. Not all sudden tire failures are caused by under-inflation. Structural damages caused, for example, by hitting sharp curbs or potholes, can also lead to sudden tire failures, even a certain time after the damaging incident. These cannot be proactively detected by any TPMS.
- Improved safety: Under-inflated tires lead to tread separation and tire failure, resulting in 40,000 accidents, 33,000 injuries and over 650 deaths per year. Further, tires properly inflated add greater stability, handling and braking efficiencies and provide greater safety for the driver, the vehicle, the loads and others on the road.
- Environmental efficiency: Under-inflated tires, as estimated by the US Department of Transportation, release over 26 billion kilograms (57.5 billion pounds) of unnecessary carbon-monoxide pollutants into the atmosphere each year in the United States alone.

Further statistics include:

The French Sécurité Routière, a road safety organization, estimates that 9% of all road accidents involving fatalities are attributable to tire under-inflation, and the German DEKRA, a product safety organization, estimated that 41% of accidents with physical injuries are linked to tire problems.

The European Union reports that an average under-inflation of 40 kPa produces an increase of fuel consumption of 2% and a decrease of tire life of 25%. The European Union concludes that tire under-inflation today is responsible for over 20 million liters of unnecessarily-burned fuel, dumping over 2 million tonnes of CO_{2} into the atmosphere, and for 200 million tires being prematurely wasted worldwide.

In 2018, a field study on TPMS and tire inflation pressure was published on the UN ECE Working Party on Brakes and Running Gear (GRRF) homepage. It covered 1,470 randomly selected vehicles in three EU countries with dTPMS, iTPMS and without TPMS. Main findings are that TPMS fitment reliably prevents severe and dangerous underinflation and hence yields the desired effects for traffic safety, fuel consumption and emissions. The study also showed that there is no difference in effectiveness between dTPMS and iTPMS and that the TPMS reset function does not present a safety risk.

== Privacy concerns with direct TPMS ==
Because each tire transmits a unique identifier, vehicles may be easily tracked using existing sensors along the roadway. This concern could be addressed by encrypting the radio communications from the sensors but such privacy provisions were not stipulated by the NHTSA.

== Heavy-duty vehicles ==
U.S. National Highway Traffic Safety Administration regulations only apply to vehicles under 10,000 pounds. For heavy-duty vehicles (Classes 7 and 8, gross vehicle weight greater than 26,000 pounds), most of the above-mentioned systems don't work well, requiring the development of other systems.

The US Department of Transportation has commissioned several studies to find systems that work on the heavy-duty market specifying some goals that were needed in this market.

The SAE has tried to disseminate best practices since legal regulations for heavy vehicles has been lagging.

== Compulsory ==
=== United States ===
The first country to have TPMS mandatory was the United States of America. In the early 2000s, numerous traffic accidents such as rollovers and tire blowouts occurred due to insufficient air pressure level. NHTSA regarded flat tires as a potential threat to safety which was soon followed by the enactment of Federal Motor Vehicle Safety Standard 138 on attaching TPMS for every vehicle by September 2007, phased in from 2005. The standard is to warn drivers of significant under-inflation of tires and the resulting safety problems of low tire pressure.

This standard requires TPMS to be installed in all new passenger cars, multipurpose passenger vehicles, trucks, and buses that have a gross vehicle weight rating (GVWR) of 4,536 kg (10,000 lbs.) or less, except those vehicles with dual wheels on an axle. The final rule requires that the driver be given a warning when tire pressure is 25 percent or more below the vehicle manufacturer's recommended cold tire inflation pressure (placard pressure) for one to four tires.

=== South Korea ===
TPMS became obligatory for every vehicle under 3.5t sold after 2013. Later in 2015, every vehicle had to have TPMS regardless of its size. In 2011, Hyundai Mobis successfully developed the TPMS and first applied it in the Veloster. As a result, the sensor's power usage is about 30% lower than that of existing products, reducing battery size and reducing sensor weight by more than 10%.

== Icons ==
TPMS system dashboard icons
TPMS low pressure warning icon

TPMS system failure icon

== See also ==
- Central tire inflation system
- Cold inflation pressure
- Nira Dynamics AB
- Tire-pressure gauge
- Loose wheel nut indicator
