= Firestone and Ford tire controversy =

1990s safety scandal involving Ford Explorer SUVs fitted with Firestone tires

The Firestone and Ford tire controversy of the 1990s saw hundreds of people die in automobile crashes caused by the failure of Firestone tires installed on light trucks and SUVs made by Ford Motor Company.

Unusually high failure rates of P235/75R15 ATX, ATX II, and Wilderness AT tires installed on the first and second-generation Ford Explorer and similar vehicles caused crashes that killed 238 people and injured around 500 others in the United States alone; more died in other countries.

The revelations halved the market value of Firestone parent company Bridgestone, which fired or accepted the resignation of several executives and closed the Decatur, Illinois, factory where the tires were manufactured. Ford also fired or accepted the resignation of executives. Each company publicly blamed the other for the defects, a disagreement that ended the companies' nearly 100-year relationship.

Congressional inquiry into the scandal led to the enactment of the Transportation Recall Enhancement, Accountability and Documentation (TREAD) Act in October 2000.

== Problem detection ==
As early as 1996, personal injury lawyers were aware of accidents, injuries, and deaths caused when the tread separated from Firestone tires at high speeds. Lawyers and traffic safety researchers decided not to contact the National Highway Traffic Safety Administration (NHTSA) because they lacked confidence in the agency and feared that an investigation might conclude that there were no defects, thereby compromising existing personal injury lawsuits. All but 13 of the 271 known deaths from these tires took place after 1996.

In 1996, the Arizona state government told Firestone that the treads on its tires were separating in high temperatures. Firestone sent several engineers to inspect the tires and concluded that normal passenger tires were being used in heavy conditions, on dirt roads, off-road, and under heavy loads. Firestone replaced those tires with heavier-duty tires.

As early as 1997, internal Firestone documents showed a rise in injury claims for the ATX, ATX II, and Wilderness AT tires.

In July 1998, Samuel Boyden, a researcher for State Farm Insurance, received a call from a claims handler asking for information about tread separation in Firestone tires. Boyden subsequently found 21 crashes caused by tread separation and forwarded the information to NHTSA. In 1999, he found an additional 30 cases which he also forwarded to NHTSA.

In 1998, Ford began replacing Firestone tires in Venezuela, where 46 deaths had occurred, according to documents uncovered by Sean Kane, a researcher at Strategic Safety Consulting. Firestone was aware of tire defects in Venezuela as early as 1999.

A Ford dealer in Saudi Arabia noticed high failure rates of Firestone tires in Saudi Arabia, Qatar, and Kuwait starting in 1997 and in July 1999 began replacing Firestone tires on unsold Ford Explorers and to offer a 75% discount for replacement tires when customers came in for maintenance. Ford and Firestone began testing tires in late 1997 or 1998 and began a limited recall in the Middle East, Venezuela, Malaysia, and Thailand in 1999 and the spring of 2000 but did not notify NHTSA.

On February 7, 2000, KHOU-TV in Houston Texas ran a 9-minute story about high-speed Firestone tire failures on Ford Explorers that led to 30 deaths. KHOU was overwhelmed by phone calls from concerned citizens and started directing callers to NHTSA.

In 2000, Clarence Ditlow, executive director for the Center for Auto Safety, told the Senate Committee on Commerce, Science, and Transportation, "Emerging information shows that both Ford and Firestone had early knowledge of tread separation in Firestone Tires fitted to Ford Explorer vehicles but at no point informed NHTSA of their findings".

Firestone had more information about tire failures than Ford did because of warranty claims, but Firestone never acted on this information because it always blamed consumers for not maintaining their tires correctly or operating their vehicles in extreme environments, leading to these failures. When Ford and NHTSA looked into concerns about tire failures or rollovers, they consulted consumer complaints to NHTSA's toll-free hotline. The consumer complaints did not reflect the size of the problem because attorneys and their clients had almost completely stopped using the hotline to report tire failures or other complaints.

== Investigation and possible causes ==
On March 6, 2000, NHTSA began a preliminary inquiry into the high incidence of tire failures and accidents of Ford Explorers and other light trucks and SUVs fitted with Firestone Radial ATX, ATX II, and Wilderness tires. This became a formal investigation on May 2 (PE00–020). On August 9, Firestone recalled all ATX and ATX II tires and all Wilderness AT tires manufactured in Decatur. On August 31, 2000, the Office of Defect Investigation (ODI) upgraded the investigation to an Engineering Analysis (EA00–023) to determine whether Firestone's recall covered all the defective tires.

Ford and Firestone both sent root-cause analyses to NHTSA. Firestone argued that vehicle weight, tire design, low recommended inflation pressure, and lower tire adhesion for tires manufactured at the Decatur factory contributed to the tire failures. Ford argued that the tire design led to higher operating temperatures than similar tires manufactured by Goodyear; that Firestone tires' relatively small wedge, a strip of rubber between the first and second belts, made them weaker and more failure-prone than comparable Michelin tires; and that there were manufacturing problems at the Decatur factory.

Publicly, Firestone argued that Ford's recommended 26 psi inflation pressure should have been 30 psi. Firestone also argued that the Explorer was abnormally dangerous and prone to rollovers after a tire failure, leading to more injuries and deaths. Firestone CEO John Lampe said, "When a driver of a vehicle has something happen such as a tread separation, they should be able to pull over, not rollover."

Ford argued that the Explorer was no more dangerous than any other SUV and that the accident rate for Explorers with Goodyear tires was far lower than for Explorers with Firestone tires.

Some outside observers argued that both parties were to blame: Firestone's tires were prone to tread separation and failure, and the Explorer was especially prone to rolling over if a tire fails at speed compared to other vehicles.

=== Ford Explorer ===
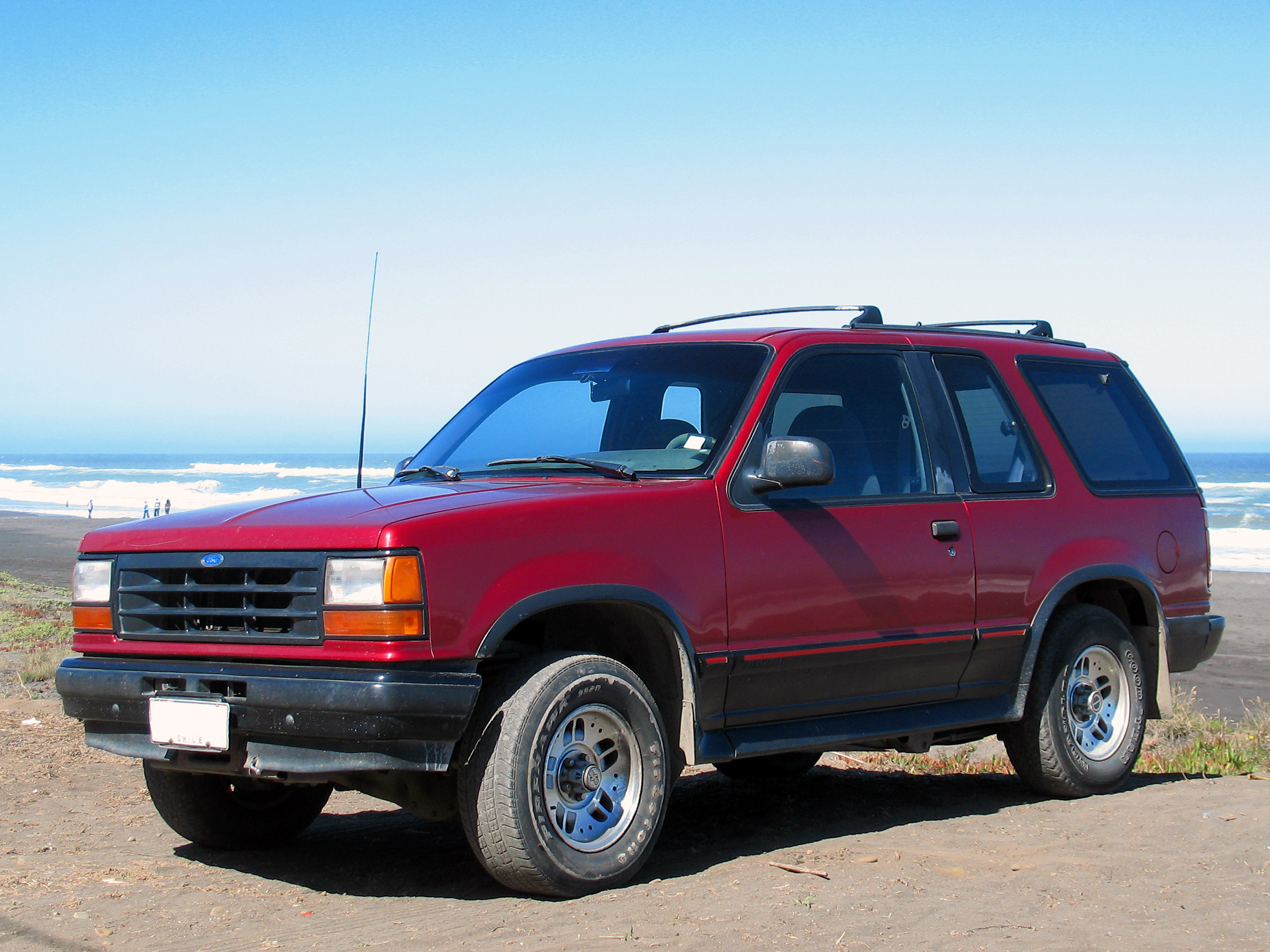
'91–'94 Ford Explorer

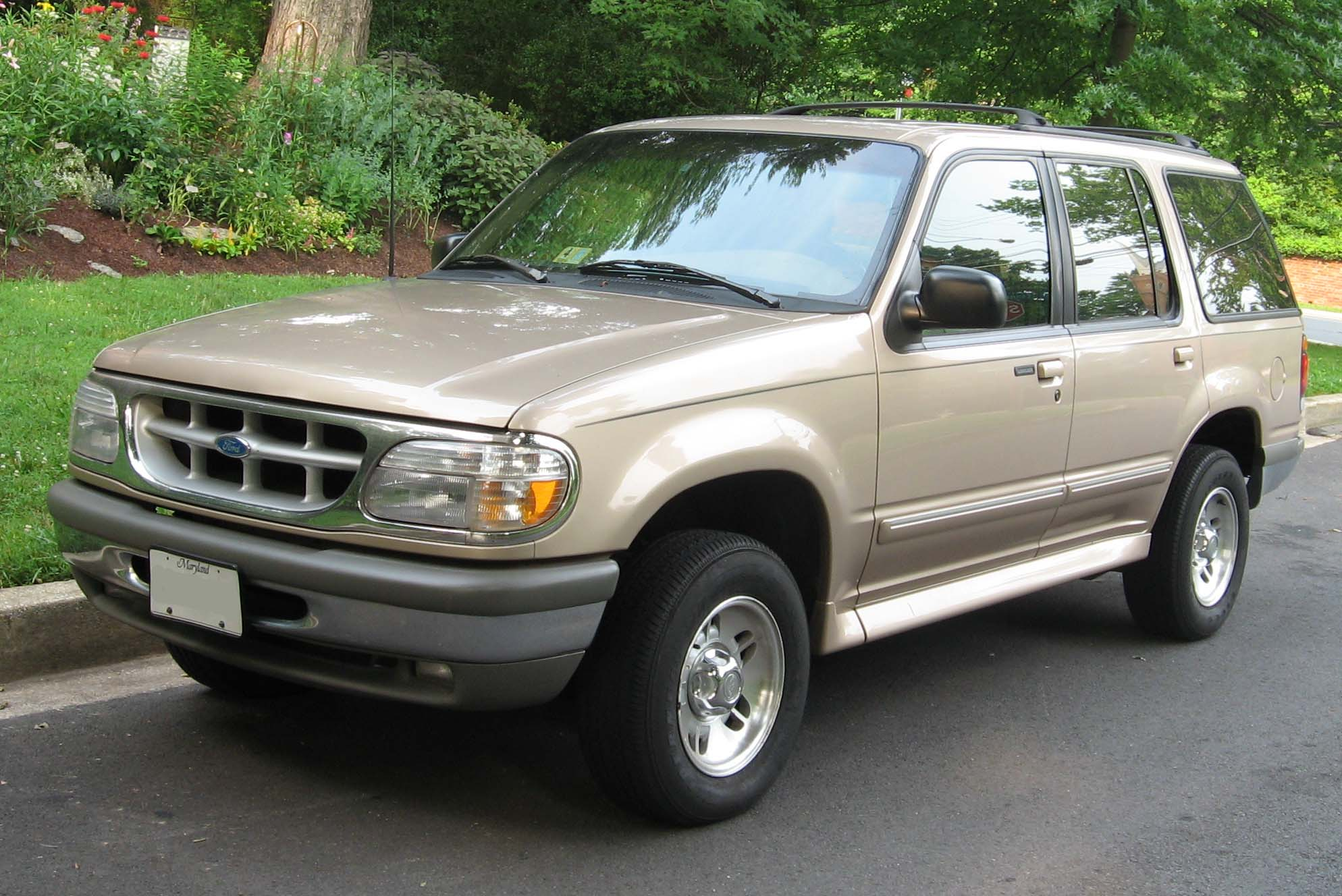
'95–'98 Ford Explorer

Ford designed the first-generation Explorer by mounting an SUV cabin on a Ford Ranger undercarriage. This cut production costs because Ford could use existing facilities, parts, and robots. But the extra upper cabin weight on the pickup chassis created a vehicle with a higher center of gravity that was more likely to roll over in an accident. It was also more likely to sway during sharp turns because it used the same leaf spring suspension as the Ranger. The likelihood of a crash and likelihood of injuries and death from a crash were greater in an SUV experiencing a tread separation than on a pickup truck.

Ford came up with three options for correcting this problem: use shorter suspension springs to lower the vehicle half an inch in the front and one inch in the back, lower the tire pressure to give the Explorer a more car-like ride, or widen the wheelbase by two inches. After the Explorer rolled over in company pre-production tests, Ford decided to lower the suspension and remove air from the tires to 26 psi compared to 35 psi for the same tires on the Ranger. They did not widen the wheelbase, which would have required a substantial redesign. One consequence of lowering the tire pressure is increased tire temperatures which could lead to a tire failure. Firestone warrantied these tires at 26 psi for 11 years.

First offered for sale in March 1990, the first-generation Explorer had one of the lowest fuel-economy ratings of any SUV sold in the United States, due at least in part to Ford's recommended tire pressure. While designing the second-generation Explorer, Ford made two changes to reduce weight and improve fuel economy. First, Ford replaced the Twin I-Beam suspension with a lighter-weight short- and long-arm suspension, but did not lower the engine. This raised the Explorer's center of gravity, making it more prone to rolling in an accident or sharp turn. Second, Ford reduced the amount of material in the roof. When the new model went on sale in 1995, it was discovered that this lighter roof was so weak that it would collapse under the weight of an overturned Explorer if the windshield were smashed in, as often happened in rollover accidents.

After Ford Motor Company voluntarily recalled 13 million Firestone tires on May 21, 2001, Firestone requested that NHTSA investigate the handling and safety of Ford Explorers following a tread separation. Firestone argued that the Explorer is poorly designed and exhibits dangerous oversteer in the foreseeable event that a tire fails while driving. Firestone hired a consulting engineer to analyze the performance of the Ford Explorer and other SUVs during a tread separation, this report showed that the Explorer had a greater tendency to oversteer following a tread separation than other SUVs. NHTSA examined this report as well as real-world accident data and data provided by Ford concerning the design of the Explorer and denied Firestone's request. NHTSA stated that "[t]he many crashes following tread separations of tires on these vehicles that are documented in the Firestone claims database and that have been reported to ODI by consumers and others demonstrate that such a tire failure can lead to loss of control, particularly when it is a rear tire that fails and the vehicle is being driven at high speed. However, the fact that a vehicle exhibits linear range oversteer characteristics following a rear tire tread separation does not, in itself, indicate that the vehicle contains a safety-related defect. Moreover, the data available to ODI does not indicate that Explorers... are more likely to exhibit linear range oversteer characteristics following a rear tire tread separation than many of their peers."

The Explorer was redesigned for the 2002 model year. The tire pressure was raised to 30 psi, it was widened by 2.5 inches, the suspension was lowered, and independent rear suspension and electronic stability control were added.

=== Firestone tires ===
The tires that were involved in these accidents were P235/75R15 ATX and ATX II tires and P235/75R15 and P255/70R16 Wilderness AT tires. These tires were installed as OEM equipment on the Ford Explorer, Mercury Mountaineer, Ford Bronco, Ford Ranger, Ford F-series pickup trucks, Mazda B-series pickup trucks, and Mazda Navajo between 1991 and 2000.

ATX tires were originally developed in the late 1980s for use on Ford light trucks and SUVs and were first installed on Ford trucks and SUVs in 1991. The ATX II was designed to improve the ATX's ride and the fuel economy of the Explorer. The Explorer had one of the lowest fuel economy ratings for any SUV under production at that time, due at least in part to Ford's decision to lower the tire pressure to 26 psi. Ford asked Firestone to reduce the weight of the ATX tires so that it could improve the fuel economy of the Explorer. Firestone created the ATX II by removing material from the tire which lowered the weight by 10%. Removing material from the ATX design also improved the profitability of the tire for Firestone.

The Wilderness AT tire was developed in 1993 and was designed to have better snow handling and "irregular wear targets" and had a different tread design than the ATX tires. The Wilderness AT was sold and installed on Ford trucks from 1996 to 2000 and had a temperature and heat resistance rating of "C" which is the lowest rating allowed by the NHTSA's Uniform Tire Quality Grading System. Many of the features of the ATX tires were identical to the Wilderness AT tires. In May 1998 the Wilderness AT tires were redesigned with a thicker belt wedge (see tire design below) although the name of the tire was not changed.

The defective ATX and ATX II tires were primarily manufactured at Firestone's Decatur, Illinois factory which produced tires with a significantly higher failure rate than the other two factories that manufactured these same tire models, Wilson, North Carolina and Joliette, Quebec. Wilderness AT tires manufactured before May 1998 had higher failure rates regardless of where they were manufactured and had a safety-related design defect according to NHTSA.

==== Tread separation ====
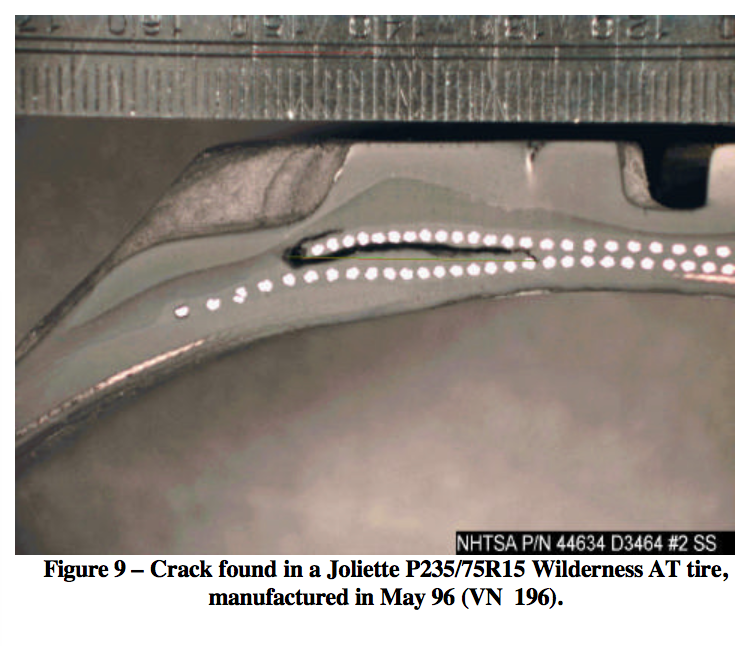
Cross section of a Firestone P235/75R15 Wilderness AT tire showing belt separation

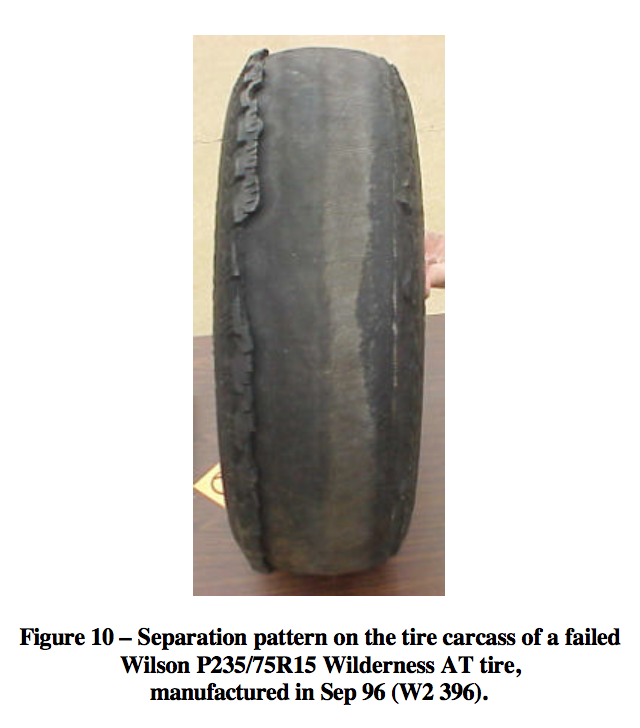
Tire tread separation of a Firestone P235/75R15 Wilderness AT tire

The failures all involved tread separation where the tire tread peeled off from the body of the tire. Tread separation, due to the interaction of steel and rubber tire elements, has been a challenge in radial tire design since their development by Michelin in 1946.

The failure of the subject tires "begin as belt-edge separation at the edge of the second belt. This is the area of highest strain in a steel-belted radial tire, primarily due to the structural discontinuity created by the abrupt change in modulus from steel to rubber." Once a tread separation begins it can grow along the circumference of the tire or laterally across the width of the tire leading to cracks that grow between the belts. As separation progressed it could grow to form large crescent-shaped areas along one or both sides of the tire. If those areas grew large enough they could separate catastrophically, especially at high speeds where the separation was aided by the centrifugal force of the spinning tire.

Vehicles with tread-separating tires were difficult to control especially when the failing tire was on a rear wheel and when the vehicle was moving fast.

A vehicle with a tread-separating rear tire will pull towards the side of the vehicle with the failed tire. The longer it takes the tread to separate the more the vehicle pulls in that direction. While the tread is separating the vehicle will oversteer while the tread-separating tire is on the outside of a turn. Once the tread separation has completed the vehicle will cease pulling in any direction.

Tread separations for Firestone ATX, ATX II, and Wilderness AT tires were significantly worse than for comparable tires manufactured by other companies including the Goodyear Wrangler RT/S which was also installed on new Ford Explorers.

The tread-separating tire was most frequently the left-rear wheel of the vehicle. Reasons suggested include additional heat from the exhaust, higher weight on the driver's side because vehicles are often driven without any passengers or higher temperatures in the middle of the road than on the shoulders.

==== Causes ====
There were several primary causes for the tread separations: tire age, manufacturing facility, operating temperature, tire design, as well as labor and management problems in Bridgestone/Firestone and at the Decatur, Illinois factory.

===== Tire age =====
The belt wedge and skim rubber compounds change as they age. Skim rubber is a thin strip of rubber sandwiched between the inner and outer belts and the belt wedge is a thin strip of rubber installed along the outer edge of the tire between the two steel belts and in the area of highest stress on the tire. These changes reduce the ability of the tire to resist crack growth and belt separation. Most of the tread separations occurred on tires that had been in service for at least three years. ATX and Wilderness AT tires manufactured in Decatur started to fail between one and two years after production, but between two and three years for tires from Wilson and between three and four years for tires from Joliette. Tire aging for Wilderness AT tires, regardless of the factory that produced them, was similar to other tires manufactured at Decatur and was worse than comparable tires manufactured by Goodyear.

===== Manufacturing facility =====
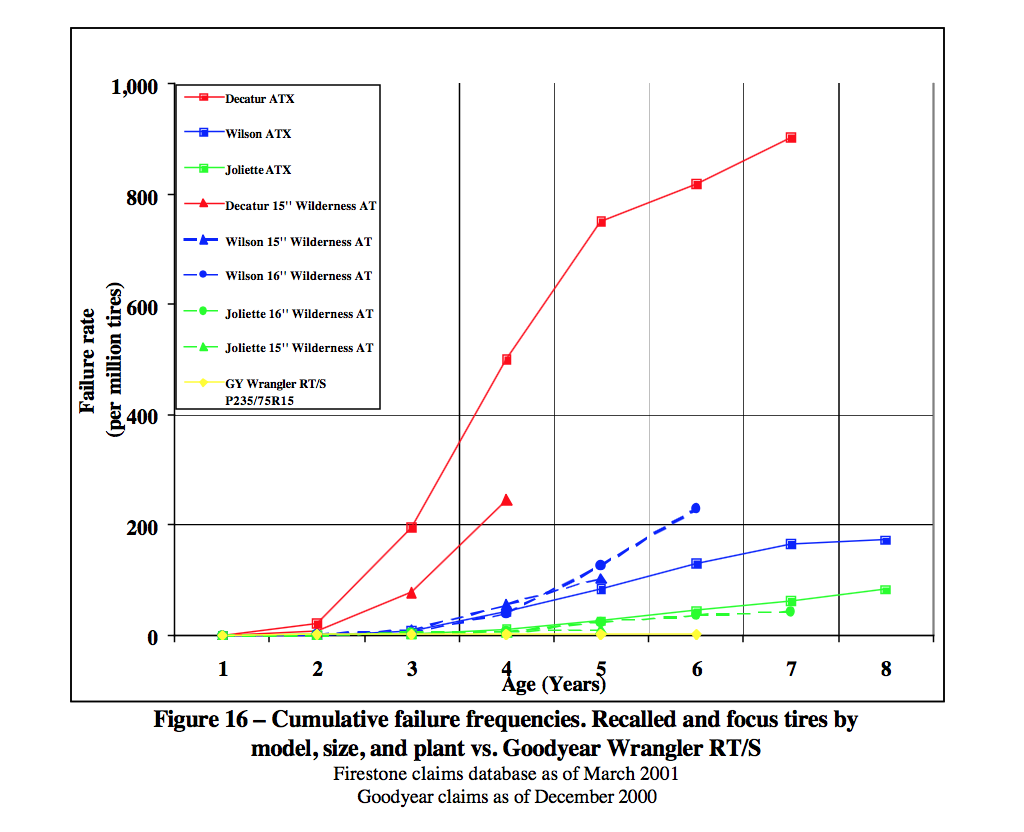
Cumulative failure rates of Firestone tires manufactured at different plants.

The failure rates for ATX and ATX II tires manufactured at the Decatur, Illinois, factory were higher than for the other factories that also manufactured these same tire models, Wilson, North Carolina, and Joliette, Quebec. Tires manufactured in Decatur had "reduced fracture resistance" compared to tires manufactured at Joliette or Wilson. That is, once a crack formed within the tire, the crack would spread more readily than on comparable tires from the Joliette or Wilson factories. Researchers also tested belt adhesion strength by measuring the force that it would take to peel a strip of the second belt from the rest of the tire. ATX and ATX II tires manufactured at Decatur had lower belt adhesion strength than the same tires manufactured at Joliette or Wilson.

The only manufacturing difference in the Decatur factory was in "the early material mixing stages which results in the production of materials with differing weight percentages of processing lubricant." However, there was insufficient evidence to conclude that this would weaken a tire or lead to a premature failure.

===== Operating temperature =====
A tire's operating temperature will increase with higher vehicle load, speed, air temperature, and with lower tire inflation pressure. The combination of inflation pressure, speed, and vehicle load could increase the tire temperature as much as 122 degrees °F (50 °C) above the ambient air temperature. Higher operating temperatures will increase the rate of oxidative aging. Tires that were used in southern climates were less ductile and stiffer than tires that operated in northern climates. Tires in warmer climates also showed higher levels of cure and had somewhat lower peel strength. The role of air temperature would explain why geographic regions with higher air temperatures had the highest tire failure rates. These results held up even for tires that had zero percent tread wear.

Higher vehicle loads increased belt crack growth rates. Of the four factors involved in the growth of cracks in the tires, vehicle load was the single most important factor.

The Explorer weighs more than the Ford Ranger and has a higher Gross Vehicle Weight Rating (GVWR) while also having a lower recommended tire pressure. This difference in weight and tire pressure explains why Ford Explorers had far more tire failures than Ford Rangers even though they used the same tire models. Despite these differences, investigators were concerned that Ford Rangers would also see an increase in tire failures if those tires were not recalled.

===== Tire design =====
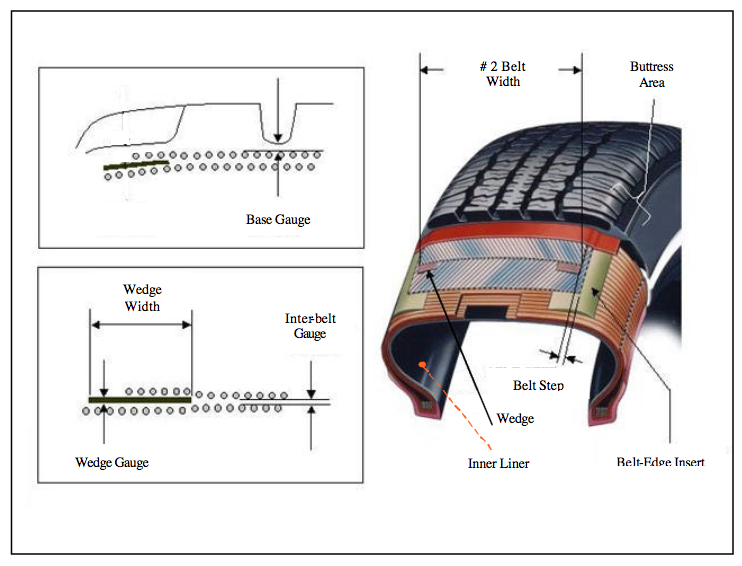
Diagram showing steel belts, belt wedge, and design of radial tire

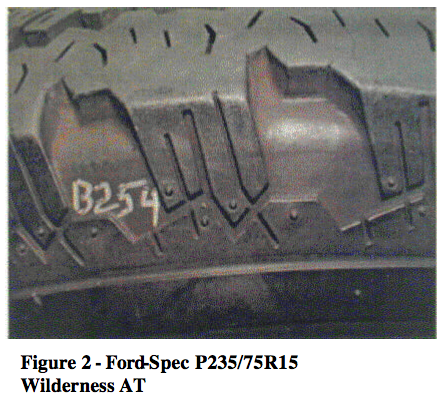
Shoulder pocket of Wilderness AT tires. The pocket is the gap along the edge of the tire between the lug or tread, e.g. above "B254" in this picture.

Before May 1998, the belt wedge gauge for ATX and Wilderness AT tires was less than for comparable tires from other manufacturers. The wedge gauge on completed tires was also less than Firestone's minimum standards. The wedge on these tires was not large enough to resist crack formation and growth. The design of the belt wedge changed in May 1998 making it larger and comparable in size to tires manufactured by other companies.

On Wilderness AT tires, the inter-belt gauge, or a strip of rubber between the two steel belts, was often thinner than Firestone's minimum specification and the design was thinner than comparable tires from other manufacturers.

The design of the shoulder pocket, a "cavity between the heavy ribs, or lugs, along the shoulders of the tire" on the Wilderness AT tires, could lead to high stresses along the tire edge, allowing cracks to form in the belt wedge.

Peel adhesion tests, where a strip of the second belt was pulled off the body of the tire, showed that Wilderness AT tires were weaker than similar tire models manufactured by other companies. Wilderness AT tires were comparable in strength to tires manufactured at the Decatur, Illinois factory, regardless of which factory the Wilderness AT were manufactured in.

Wilderness AT tires had similar shearography results regardless of which factory produced them. Cracks and separations were more frequent than similar tires produced by other manufacturers.

In 2000, Firestone added a nylon cap to reduce the problem of tread separation in all of its tire models installed on SUVs.

===== Labor and management problems =====
Bridgestone purchased Firestone in 1988 to compete with other large multinational tire companies and took on a considerable amount of debt to complete the purchase and upgrade Firestone's manufacturing facilities. At that time Firestone was losing a considerable amount of money each year which put a drain on Bridgestone's profits. Bridgestone pressured Firestone to cut manufacturing and labor costs to improve revenues. Critics and workers claim that this led Firestone to cut corners on production and to allow substandard tires to pass inspection that should have been rejected. This also led Firestone to pressure workers to accept new labor contracts that reduced pay and benefits and increased the hours that its factories were operating.

In a deposition retired Firestone workers testified that quality control problems at the Decatur factory could have led workers to manufacture defective tires. One worker stated that, despite getting a company discount, he'd stopped purchasing Firestone tires years before the crisis developed because of quality control problems. Others stated that they had to inspect as many as 100 tires per hour which they believed were far too many tires to do an adequate job; that they were told to sign off on tires that they did not actually inspect; that they rolled unvulcanized tire carcasses, also called a "green tire", across the factory floor which could allow debris from the floor to end up inside a completed tire; that they used an awl to puncture bubbles in tires; and that they were told to use a solvent similar to benzene on tire adhesives that had lost its tack from sitting too long in a humid factory. Organic solvents are commonly used in the tire industry as an ingredient in adhesives used to bond rubber components together. Industry observers, lawyers and workers claimed that too much of the solvent could damage the rubber in a tire and could lead to premature tire failures. Firestone claimed that these were disgruntled workers who quit after a bitter strike. "The comments of these former employees should be evaluated with a critical eye, given that they were carefully selected out of the thousands of current and former employees of the Decatur plant by plaintiffs' personal injury lawyers."

Yoichiro Kaizaki, CEO and president of Bridgestone, stated that there were two different standards for quality control within Bridgestone. If a problem developed in a Bridgestone factory, "our technology staff would rush to the site [overseas]. But if a problem arose with a Firestone tire, they wouldn't do anything." "We let the U.S. unit use its own culture. There was an element of mistake in that."

===== United Rubber Workers strike =====
The tires that failed were primarily manufactured at Firestone's Decatur, Illinois, factory during a time of labor unrest and a strike against Firestone carried out by the United Rubber Workers (URW) and the United Steel Workers (USW).

In January 1994, Firestone and the URW entered into new contract negotiations. Firestone demanded considerable concessions from the union. These concessions included switching from an 8-hour workday to 12-hour alternating shifts so the factory could remain in operation 24 hours a day, a pay cut by 30 percent for new hires, a seven-day workweek instead of five days, hourly workers would contribute to their healthcare plan, a switch from a piece-rate system to a performance based system, and senior workers were to lose two weeks of vacation time.

By April 1994, the existing labor contract ended and workers continued to work at the factory until the URW called a general strike in July at Decatur and four other Firestone facilities. Almost immediately Firestone began hiring replacement workers at all their facilities and by January 1995 Firestone had hired 2,300 replacement workers who were paid thirty percent less. Over time union workers started to cross the picket line and by May 1995 there were 1,048 replacement workers and 371 permanent workers at Decatur. At that time the URW voted to unconditionally end the strike to block Firestone from hiring even more replacement workers and then holding a union decertification election. While the strike ended the labor negotiations continued. In July 1995 the URW had run out of money and was absorbed by the USW. During the time period from May 1995 to December 1996 union workers worked alongside non-union replacements. Labor negotiations between Firestone and the USW continued but many union workers could not return to work because their jobs had been replaced. The union described that time period as "brutal." The USW continued to negotiate specifically trying to get Firestone to allow all union workers to return to their jobs. In December 1996, the USW finally reached an agreement and all union workers were allowed to return to work.

Tires with the highest rates of failure were manufactured in the months right before the union went on strike but after labor negotiations had begun, and later after union workers began to cross the picket line and work without a contract alongside replacement workers. Other Firestone factories (Joliette, Quebec and Wilson, North Carolina) also produced the same tire models but had far lower failure rates. Failure rates at the Decatur plant before the labor negotiations began, while the replacement workers worked without union workers, and after the labor negotiations ended, were comparable to the failure rate of tires manufactured at the Joliette and Wilson plants.

Other studies have found that labor unrest reduces the quality of work by union members, suggesting that there should be additional inspections and heightened scrutiny by regulators during strikes.

== Recall ==
On August 17, 1999, Ford in Saudi Arabia began replacing Firestone tires on unsold Ford Explorers and to offer steep discounts on replacement tires to customers who returned to Ford dealers for regular maintenance. While this was not officially a recall Ford still replaced Firestone tires on 6,800 Ford Explorers and Mercury Mountaineers.

In February 2000, Ford began to recall Firestone tires in Malaysia and Thailand.

In May 2000, Ford recalled 150,000 Firestone tires on Explorers in Venezuela, Colombia and Ecuador. In August 2000 Bridgestone/Firestone issued a recall in Venezuela of 62,000 Venezuelan made Firestone tires. The recall was estimated to cost $6 million.

On August 9, 2000, Firestone issued a recall covering 6.5 million P235/75R15 Firestone ATX and ATX II tires and P235/75R15 Wilderness AT tires manufactured after 1991 and 1996 respectively. The recall covered all ATX and ATX II tires regardless of which plant they originated from but only covered Wilderness AT tires from Firestone's Decatur plant. Firestone had produced 14.4 million tires that were covered by this recall but it was estimated that only 6.5 million remained in service. Wilderness AT tires manufactured in Joliette, Quebec and Wilson, North Carolina were not included in the recall. On August 21, 2000, Ford halted production at three truck assembly plants so that 70,000 tires could be diverted towards the recall effort. P235/75R15 tires became scarce and Ford authorized dealers to install replacement tires from companies other than Firestone. Both Ford and Firestone looked for replacement tires internationally.

On May 22, 2001, Ford announced a voluntary recall of all Wilderness AT tires of 15, 16, and 17 inches installed on all Ford trucks and SUVs. This covered an additional 13 million Firestone tires and cost Ford $3 billion.

On October 4, 2001, NHTSA issued a mandatory recall of 3.5 million P235/75R15 and P255/70R16 Wilderness AT tires manufactured prior to May 1998 that were assembled in either the Joliette, Quebec or Wilson, North Carolina factories. This recall removed all remaining Wilderness AT tires that were manufactured prior to May, 1998. NHTSA concluded that the rubber wedge between the outer edge of the two belts was not thick enough on Wilderness AT tires and not strong enough to resist crack formation and growth. Wilderness AT tires manufactured after May 1998 had a thicker wedge making them more robust.

In November 2013, two recalled Wilderness AT tires were found in Atlanta, Georgia. One of the tires was offered for sale as new at a used tire retail shop.

== Fallout ==
=== Injuries and fatalities ===
As of September 2001, NHTSA had reported that 271 people were killed, and more than 500 people were injured in the United States as a result of tire failures. Of the Firestone models under investigation, 192 fatalities could be attributed to tread separation, and 33 fatalities could be attributed to blowouts. 33 fatalities were caused by unknown tire failure modes. The large majority of accidents took place in California, Arizona, Texas, and Florida. An additional 46 people were killed in Venezuela.

=== Lawsuits ===
Many lawsuits were filed against both Ford and Firestone. The outcomes of most lawsuits were kept confidential, but one attorney estimated that Ford settled 1,500 cases regarding the safety of the Explorer. Ford's own financial statements indicate that it spent $590 million to settle personal injury and class action lawsuits. Firestone set aside $800 million to handle lawsuits related to the recalled tires.

By February 2000, when KHOU-TV in Texas ran a story about tire failures on Ford Explorers, Firestone had recorded 193 personal injury claims, 2,288 property damage claims, and was a defendant in 66 lawsuits. In 2000 Firestone was served with 413 individual lawsuits in state and federal courts. By July 2002 Ford and Bridgestone/Firestone had settled more than 600 cases. By late 2003 Bridgestone/Firestone and Ford had settled 1,300 cases.

In November 2001, Firestone agreed to pay $41.5 million to end state lawsuits against Firestone. In 2003, Firestone settled a class action lawsuit by agreeing to pay $15.5 million for consumer education focusing on tire safety and $19 million in legal fees and $2,500 each to 45 plaintiffs. In 2005 Firestone paid Ford $240 million to settle claims related to the recall.

Ford and Firestone worked to settle cases out of court to avoid punitive damages and were paying between $4 million and $8 million to settle cases involving fatalities and between $12 million to $16 million to settle cases of paralysis.

Lawyers for the plaintiffs argued that both Ford and Firestone knew of the dangers but did nothing, and that Ford knew that the Explorer was highly prone to rollovers. Firestone argued that Ford's recommended inflation pressure of 26 psi was too low and should have been 30 psi, and that the Explorer was an especially dangerous vehicle prone to rollovers.

=== Congressional investigation ===
Congress began hearings in September 2000 to find out why it took so long for NHTSA to discover these tire defects and why Ford and Firestone were aware of tire failures as early as 1996 but never reported the information to NHTSA. The investigation led Congress to pass the Transportation Recall Enhancement, Accountability and Documentation Act or TREAD Act on October 11, 2000 which was signed into law on November 1.

=== Ford/Firestone corporate relations ===
Relations between Ford and Bridgestone/Firestone deteriorated after NHTSA began investigating the tire failures in May 2000. Ford first accused Firestone of withholding data that Ford needed to determine which tires might be unsafe. Firestone then accused Ford of withholding safety data concerning the design of the Explorer. After Firestone agreed to the initial recall of 14.4 million tires on August 9, 2000, NHTSA continued to push Firestone to recall all ATX, ATX II, and Wilderness AT tires regardless of where they were manufactured. Ford executives were concerned that NHTSA might decide that the Wilderness AT tires would not meet future safety standards and decided to recall these tires on their own. Before Ford could publicly announce this decision John T. Lampe (Chairman & CEO of Bridgestone/Firestone) announced on May 21, 2001 in a public letter to Jacques Nasser (Ford Motor Company chief executive) that Bridgestone/Firestone would no longer enter into new contracts with Ford Motor Company, effectively ending a 100-year supply relationship. The letter included accusations that the Ford Explorer was unsafe and called on NHTSA to investigate design flaws in the SUV. On May 22, 2001, angry that Firestone would not expand the recall, Jacques Nasser at Ford announced a voluntary recall of all Wilderness AT tires that were not subject to the original recall.

=== Corporate firings and resignations ===
The chairman and CEO of Bridgestone/Firestone, Masatoshi Ono, resigned in October 2000 and was replaced by John Lampe. In January 2001, the CEO and president of Bridgestone, Yoichiro Kaizaki, resigned and was replaced by Shigeo Watanabe. The bitter public fight between Ford and Firestone was also a contributing factor in Ford's decision to fire Jacques Nasser in November 2001. Nasser was replaced by William Clay Ford, Jr., the great-grandson of Henry Ford, and Harvey S. Firestone, the founder of Firestone Tire and Rubber Company.

=== Firestone's Decatur plant ===
Firestone's Decatur plant was closed in December 2001 and all 1,500 employees were laid off. Firestone cited a decline in consumer demand for Firestone tires and the age of the Decatur plant as the reasons for closing that facility. It is estimated that closing the Decatur plant cost Bridgestone/Firestone $210 million.

=== Financial cost ===
It is estimated that these tire failures and rollovers cost Bridgestone/Firestone $1.67 billion and Ford Motor Company $530 million. Bridgestone's market price dropped by 50% and the resulting restructuring cost Bridgestone $2 billion. In 2001, Ford recorded a loss of $5.5 billion.

== See also ==
- Corporate abuse
- Crisis management
- Industrial relations
- Labor relations
- Tire-pressure Monitoring System
