= Transportation Recall Enhancement, Accountability and Documentation Act =

Transportation Recall Enhancement, Accountability, and Documentation Act
- Long title: An act to amend title 49, United States Code, to require reports concerning defects in motor vehicles or tires or other motor vehicle equipment in foreign countries, and for other purposes.
- Acronyms (colloquial): TREAD
- Enacted by: the 106th United States Congress
- Effective: November 1, 2000

Citations
- Public law: Pub. L. 106–414 (text) (PDF)

Legislative history
- Introduced in the House by Fred Upton (R-MI) on September 13, 2000; Committee consideration by House Energy and Commerce; Passed the House on October 10, 2000; Passed the Senate on October 11, 2000; Signed into law by President Bill Clinton on November 1, 2000

The Transportation Recall Enhancement, Accountability and Documentation or TREAD Act (Pub. L. 106–414 (text) (PDF)) is a United States federal law enacted in the fall of 2000. This law intended to increase consumer safety through mandates assigned to the National Highway Traffic Safety Administration (NHTSA). It was drafted in response to fatalities related to Ford Explorers fitted with Firestone tires and was influenced by automobile, tire manufacturers, and consumer safety advocates. After congressional hearings were held in September 2000, Congress, in only an 18-hour span, passed the TREAD Act in October 2000. The Act was signed into law by President Clinton on November 1, 2000, and has been amended into the National Traffic and Motor Vehicle Safety Act of 1966, codified at 49 U.S.C. §§ 30101–30170.

== Components ==
There are three major components of the TREAD Act:

- First, it requires that vehicle manufacturers report to the National Highway & Transportation Safety Administration (NHTSA) when it conducts a safety recall or other safety campaign in a foreign country.
- Second, vehicle manufacturers need to report information related to defects, reports of injury or death related to its products, as well as other relevant data in order to comply with "Early Warning" requirements.
- Third, there is criminal liability where a vehicle manufacturer intentionally violates the new reporting requirements when a safety-related defect has subsequently caused death or serious bodily injury. There are a number of other smaller provisions which mostly address manufacturers of vehicle tires and guidance to the NHTSA on reporting data. The "Early Warning" requirement is the heart of the TREAD Act, enabling the NHTSA to collect data, notice trends, and warn consumers of potential defects in vehicles.

== Related links ==
- Tire-pressure monitoring system
- FMVSS 138
