= Run-flat tire =

Vehicle tire resistant to deflation

A run-flat tire or run-flat tyre (RFT) is a pneumatic vehicle tire designed to resist the effects of deflation when punctured, allowing the vehicle to continue to be driven at reduced speeds for limited distances. First developed by tire manufacturer Michelin in the 1930s, run-flat tires were introduced to the public market in the 1980s.

== Technologies ==
There are three basic technologies currently available, described below.

=== Self-supporting ===
The origins of the commercial self-supporting run-flat tire started in 1935 with a tire that had a fabric inner tire. The tire was advertised as a protection against blowouts, a common and dangerous occurrence in the 1930s.

In 1934, Michelin introduced a tire that was based on technology developed for local commuter trains and trolleys. It had a safety rim inside the tire which if punctured would run on a special foam lining. The tire was sold for military use and for specialized vehicles like bank armoured cars. It was advertised as "semi-bulletproof". While the tire performed as advertised it was far too expensive to be a feasible option for most private automobile users.

In 1958, Chrysler teamed with Goodyear Tire and Rubber Company to offer Captive Air run-flat tires using an interlining to carry the weight.

In 1972 Dunlop launched the Total Mobility Tyre (later Denovo) "fail-safe" wheel and tire system that became optional equipment on the Rover P6 3500 in 1973, and by 1983 evolved into the TD/Denloc which became standard equipment across the whole Austin Metro range.

Most recently, Bridgestone and Pirelli run-flat tires are supplied on some new model BMW cars. The automaker promoted these as a safety feature and as an alternative to carrying a spare tire.

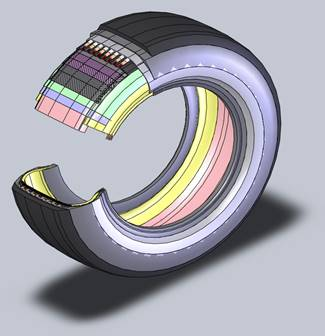
Cut-Out View of PZT Tire

Pressure Zero Tire (PZT) was pioneered by American Engineering Group (AEG) for US Special Forces. AEG prototype dissipates heat and has the tire flexibility and strength to support the heavy military pick-up weight while providing a relatively smooth ride. The durability characteristics of this design were studied further on four different tire sizes for ATV Polaris, Toyota Hilux, and Toyota Land Cruiser & GMV 1.1. special operations vehicles.

Self-supporting run-flat tires are now common on light trucks and passenger cars and typically allows the vehicle to be driven for 50 miles (80 km) at around 50 miles per hour (80 km/h). However, if the tires are subject to this kind of misuse, wheels may become damaged in the process, and repair may be impossible or unsafe, especially if the tire is punctured in the sidewall or at the edge of the tread. These tires carry a 20% to 40% weight penalty over similar standard tires and the thicker sidewall also means higher rolling resistance, which reduces the vehicle's fuel economy. However, the weight penalty of the individual tire is usually more than compensated by the fact that the vehicle need no longer carry a spare, as well as the equipment needed to swap in the spare. The thicker sidewall however results in more road imperfections filtering through the tire to the rim and hence to the car, which results in a harsher ride.

=== Self-sealing ===
These tires contain an extra lining within the tire that self-seals in the event of a small hole due to a nail or screw. In this way, the loss of air is prevented from the outset such that the tire is either permanently self-repairing or at least loses air very slowly.

There are also a number of retrofitted tire sealants which act in a similar way to self-sealing tires. These compounds are normally injected through the tire valve. The rotating force then distributes the compound onto the inner surface of the tire to act as a self-sealing lining within the tire.

=== Auxiliary-supported ===
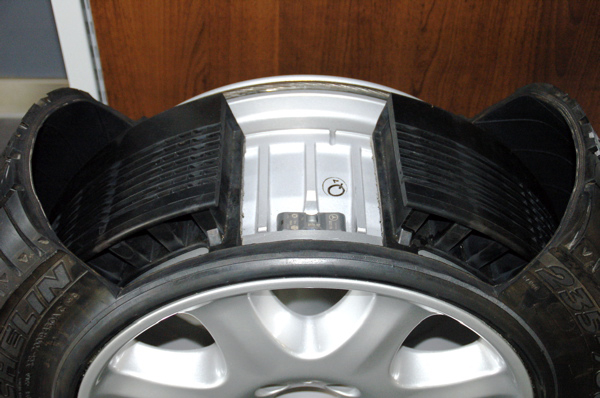
Run-flat tire with support ring

In this system, there is an additional support ring or insert attached to the wheel that can support the weight of the vehicle in the event of a loss of pressure. The run-flat insert has an unsurpassed ability to carry heavy vehicle loads for long distances at high speeds. It is therefore the normal run-flat selection for military vehicles, high-level executive protection vehicles, and armored vehicles used by government, aid groups, or private contractors in conflict zones.

== Standards of performance ==
The basic benefit of using run-flat tires is continued mobility in case of a loss of air pressure, due either to a "normal" puncture or to a hostile deliberate act including a bullet strike while the vehicle is traveling at high speed. Performance criteria are therefore in terms of distance and speed at which the vehicle can escape without becoming immobile and the steering control over the vehicle during this process.

The usual standard of performance, especially for military or security vehicles, are the Finabel standards.

== Market share ==
Run-flat tires accounted for less than 1% of replacement tire sales in the U.S. in 2005. In 2006, it was expected that such tires would gain popularity with armored vehicle manufacturers, but growth figures were slow with one major model, the Michelin PAX System, no longer being developed by the manufacturer (though replacements will be produced for the foreseeable future). A Michelin study released in 2008 found that 3% of drivers worldwide want run-flat tires. U.S. market share is well below 1%. American Honda Motor Co. announced that the 2009 Honda Odyssey Touring and Acura RL were its last models available with run-flat tires and with Honda no longer using run-flats. This leaves only a handful of volume manufacturers offering them as standard fittings and only on some models. An exception is BMW, who are the largest fitter of run-flats as original equipment.

Former US President Barack Obama's presidential limo, "the Beast", had Goodyear Kevlar lined run-flat tires.

=== Factors contributing to small market share ===
The cost can be more than double other tires of comparable size. Also, run-flat tires cannot be run flat if the flat is due to sidewall damage, a common cause of flats. Generally, under ideal circumstances, the speed and range of run-flat tires is limited. Run-flat tires cannot be driven over 50 miles per hour most of the time, and usually offer only up to 50 miles of extended mobility. These limitations lower the value of the extra expense for many buyers. In certain applications, depending on the vehicle, specific tire design, and driving surface, a run-flat tire can provide from 25 to 200 miles (40 to 322 km) driving while flat with limited speed.

== See also ==
- Airless tire
- Direct TPMS
- Tire manufacturing
- Tire mousse
- Tire-pressure monitoring system
- Tweel - Michelin's air-free tire
