= Direct TPMS =

Automotive pressure monitoring system

Direct TPMS, or direct tire pressure monitoring systems (direct sensor TPMS) refers to the use of a pressure sensor directly mounted on the wheels or tires of a vehicle. The pressure inside the tire is measured using a pressure transducer with the pressure information being subsequently sent to the vehicle to warn the driver of under or over inflation of a tire. The pressure information is commonly transmitted to the vehicle using radio frequency (RF) technology, though systems using mechanical, electrical or magnetic methods have been used over recent years.

== Typical system ==
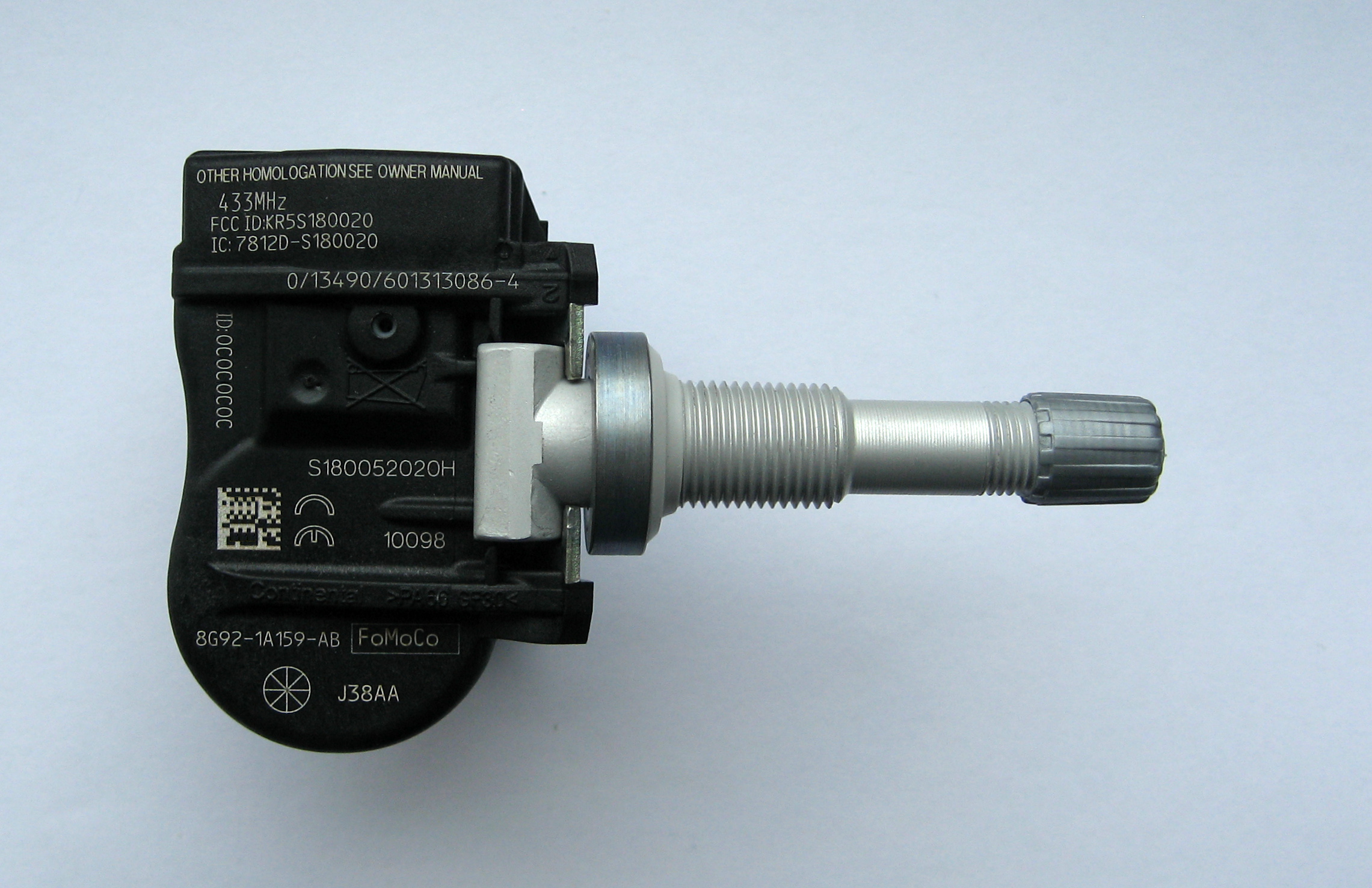
direct TPM sensor fitted in valve system, manufacturer VDO

In most current designs of direct TPMS, a small electronic assembly which is rugged enough to be mounted inside a tire, measures the pressure using a microelectromechanical system (MEMS) pressure sensor and then transmits this and other information to one or more vehicle receivers. Other information can include a serial number, temperature, acceleration, direction of rotation and the status of the complete tire pressure monitoring system. The purpose of the serial number is to allow the vehicle to ignore transmissions from other vehicles and operate with a unique data field. A typical direct TPMS (e.g. Ford, BMW or Toyota) comprises the following components on a vehicle:

- A direct TPM sensor fitted to the back of the valve stem on each wheel
- A TPM Warning Light
- Unique identifier (IDs) for which tire is providing the data including speed and the direction of rotation
- A tire pressure monitor electronic control unit (ECU)
- Antenna(s)
- Controller for periodic measurements
- Source of power
- Diagnostics and wake up system

Most direct TPMS systems use ultra high frequency (UHF) radio in one of the 'unlicensed' ISM bands (industrial, scientific and medical) for transmitting the data, often around 433 MHz in Europe and 315 MHz in much of the rest of the world. On some systems there is a separate receiver or antenna near each wheel whilst more commonly there is a single receiver which receives data from all of the wheels on the vehicle. Commonly this receiver is also used for remote keyless entry system (RKE) as this also usually uses UHF radio transmissions.

TPM sensors can be fitted to the wheels in a number of ways. They can be mounted on the back of the tire's valve stem or attached using adhesive or to a band which is then securely wrapped around the rim inside the tire, usually in the drop zone.

=== Direct tire pressure monitor system warning light ===
When the direct TPMS warning light comes on, either one of the tires is under-inflated, severely over-inflated, or there is a fault with the system. If the light is constant then inflating to the correct placard pressure should turn it off. If this is not the case then this indicates a puncture. If the light is intermittent or if it stays on after correct inflation or replacement of a punctured tire then this indicates a fault with the direct TPMS system.

=== Registration of direct TPMS IDs ===
When the direct TPMS system is fitted at the factory the unique ID numbers of the TPM (tire pressure monitoring) sensors have to be registered along with their position on the vehicle with the tire pressure monitor ECU. This is also the case if any of the system components are subsequently changed e.g. in the event of rotating the tires, changing sensors, replacing the ECU etc.

This process requires the activation of the direct TPMS sensor using low frequency (LF) radio and the capture of the UHF data transmitted. This data includes the direct TPMS ID, the pressure and the temperature. In automotive manufacturing plants, the activation is carried out using large antenna systems whilst in the dealerships and tire shops, hand tools are used. These tools can also be used to check the direct TPMS for faults prior to disassembly. If a TPM sensor or its position on the car are changed without re-registering the IDs, then the TPMS warning light will turn on and stay on until the IDs are re-registered.

== Localization ==
If there are multiple antennas or receivers, this permits localization of the TPM such that the vehicle can tell from which wheel the pressure data has come. As an alternative to this method, the vehicle can be programmed at the time of manufacture with the position of the tire together with its TPM serial number. This allows the vehicle to display which tire has low pressure.

Also, some vehicles have low frequency radio transmitters mounted near to each wheel which can be used to force the individual TPMs to transmit at will. These typically use similar technology to 125 kHz RFID tags where the transmitted field is predominantly magnetic and can be easily detected by a small LF antenna located in the TPM. This method of localization is often referred to as a high line system.

The LF antenna is also often used by the TPM for configuration and to force transmission so that localization can be re-learned by the vehicle if a sensor is changed or the wheels are rotated.

A third method uses the UHF signal strength which is proportional to the distance of the TPM from the receiver. If the receiver is located towards the front of the vehicle, the signal from the front wheel TPM's will be stronger than that from the wheels at the rear.

In those systems, the TPM's have a method of detecting the rotational direction of the wheel, which forms part of the message transmitted to the receiver. This information allows the receiver to identify which side of the vehicle the TPMS transmits from. Combined with the signal strength, the correct wheel can be identified.

== TPM sensor features ==
The TPM sensors currently fitted to high volume production cars worldwide are battery-powered, self-contained units which periodically measure tire pressure, and often temperature and acceleration. The sensor is equipped with an RF transmitter circuit which is used to broadcast the measured pressure etc. within the tire.

The TPM is designed to use as little power as possible to give maximum battery life. This is done by using very low power circuitry and transmitting the data as infrequently as possible and with as low power as possible. The UHF transmitter in a TPM typically transmits around 250μW (1μW is equal to one millionth (10^{−6}) of a watt).

TPMs do not have UHF receivers built in due to the relatively high power requirements of this technology. This means that they can't tell that they are transmitting at the same time as another TPM. Most TPMs do have LF receivers as this uses little or no power.

The pressure, temperature and acceleration sensors generate analog signals which are converted to their digital equivalents using analog to digital converters. The acceleration sensor measures the centrifugal force generated when the wheel rotates. This force is proportional to the rotational speed. The acceleration sensor may be a simple switch rather than an analog transducer (accelerometer). This is usually referred to as a roll switch. The acceleration sensor allows the TPM to be placed in a low-power communication device mode, when the vehicle is stationary which can extend the battery life. The advantage of a roll switch over an accelerometer is that the switch is purely mechanical and doesn't use any power to take a measurement.

When the vehicle is stationary, the TPM may periodically transmit to the vehicle. This allows (as long as the vehicle receiver is always on) the driver or vehicle operator to be warned of low pressure as soon as the Ignition system is switched on rather than having to wait until the vehicle is moving.

All TPM units on a vehicle operate on the same RF channel frequency and each message includes pressure data, temperature data, a unique ID code, operating state data, status information and check digits. The check digit is either a checksum or a cyclic redundancy check (CRC).

The TPM does not usually have information about the tire's correct pressure as this would be very difficult and possibly dangerous to support. However it may have an algorithm contained within it which detects both slow and rapid changes in pressure. This condition may be transmitted as part of the TPM's status. It may also cause the TPM to transmit more frequently.

== Direct tire pressure monitoring systems ==
There are two main types of direct tire pressure monitoring system currently in use. These are known as 'high line' and 'low line'.

=== High line system ===
If the vehicle is fitted with low frequency (LF) transmitters near each wheel, the vehicle may use these to force the sensors to transmit. In this case, the TPM may not transmit on its own, but the vehicle will periodically command the sensors to send their information.

In addition, the TPMs will be forced to transmit when the ignition is switched on. This will give an early indication of low pressure without having to have the vehicle's receiver switched on when the vehicle is not in use. The transmitters are usually activated one at a time in sequence so that the vehicle can inform the driver of the location of the wheel with low pressure. This information can then be used later for localisation by matching the TPM's unique ID with its position discovered by this sequential activation. This method is used on some high line systems where the TPM also transmits periodically.

On some vehicles only three LF transmitters are used in order to save money. The vehicle assumes that transmissions from a nearby TPM which has not been woken up by the LF belong to the TPM located where there is no LF transmitter.

High line systems are inherently more expensive than low line systems but they have the advantage of the vehicle knowing the pressure when started without draining the vehicle's main battery and providing localisation. These systems tend to be used on higher end models.

=== Low line system ===
In this system, the TPM units transmit on their own at fixed or random intervals. As the individual TPMs on the vehicle do not know if another TPM is transmitting at the same time, it is possible to have collisions between messages transmitted. Measures have to be taken to ensure that the message is received by the vehicle. On some systems the message is re-transmitted multiple times to reduce the effect of interference (communication). The transmission pattern can be random or pseudo random to reduce the chance of collisions between transmissions from the sensors on the vehicle.

Another method of attempting to avoid collisions is simply to transmit more frequently such as once per minute. In addition, if the TPM detects a rapid change in pressure or too high a temperature, it will start to transmit more frequently so that the vehicle has more chance of receiving the information. The low line system is used on the majority of vehicles due to its lower cost.

=== Aftermarket TPMS ===
Aftermarket TPMS systems are designed to be retrofitted to vehicles that were not originally equipped with the technology. These systems are available for a wide range of vehicles, from bicycles and trailers to heavy-duty trucks.

In commercial fleets, aftermarket TPMS can be integrated into a fleet telematics system and fleet digitalization. As part of a vehicle tracking system, the sensors on each tire wirelessly transmit real-time pressure and temperature data to a central telematic control unit or GPS tracking unit in the vehicle. This telematics data can be combined with GPS data for automatic vehicle location and track and trace operations. The data is relayed to a fleet management platform, allowing fleet managers to remotely monitor tire health as a form of asset tracking. This monitoring helps prevent blowouts and can improve fuel economy by ensuring correct tire inflation; this is often paired with data from a fuel level sensor to help monitor overall fuel consumption. Some systems integrate TPMS data with video telematics from a dashcam as part of a driver scoring model.

== Legal status ==
=== United States ===
The use of TPMS in vehicles in the USA was mandated in 2000 by the Transportation Recall Enhancement, Accountability and Documentation Act (or TREAD). This states that the driver of a vehicle must be warned of under inflation by 25%. The warning is displayed to the driver in line with 49 CFR Part 571 Federal Motor Vehicle Safety Standards (FMVSS). The minimum requirement for the warning is in the form of a simple lit symbol on the dashboard, and this is often augmented by the display of a graphic of the car showing the wheel position to which the warning light corresponds. All new model year 2008 light vehicles shall have a TPMS (direct or indirect) fitted which is capable of detecting when one or more of the vehicle's tires, up to all four tires, is 25% or more below the manufacturer's recommended inflation pressure (placard pressure) or a minimum activation pressure specified in the standard, whichever is higher.

=== EU and Far East ===
European Union (EU) and Far East legislators looked at TPMS as a way of reducing carbon dioxide emissions. From November 2014 (ECE-R 64 EU Directive), all new passenger cars models sold in the EU must be equipped with a TPMS.

== See also ==
- Central tire inflation system
- Cold inflation pressure
- Run-flat tire
- Tire-pressure gauge
- Car safety

== Bibliography ==
- Hawes, James; Fisher, John; Mercer, Todd (2008), Tire Pressure Monitoring Systems Guide, Mitchel1, ISBN 978-1-58718-177-1.
