= Neera (given name) =

Neera is an Indian feminine given name meaning "water".

It may refer to the following notable people:

- Neera Desai (1925–2009), Indian researcher, activist, social worker and academic
- Neera Tanden (born 1970), American political consultant and government official
- Neera Yadav (politician) (born 1971), Indian politician
- Anna Radius Zuccari (1846–1918), Italian writer who used the pen name Neera
