= Tire-pressure gauge =

Type of pressure gauge

A tire-pressure gauge, or tyre-pressure gauge, is a pressure gauge used to measure the pressure of tires on a vehicle. Proper tire pressure is crucial for vehicle safety, fuel efficiency, and tire longevity. Tire gauges come in various types, including analog, digital, and dial gauges, each offering different features and accuracy levels. Tire-pressure gauges can be used both professionally and casually and come in many different sizes.

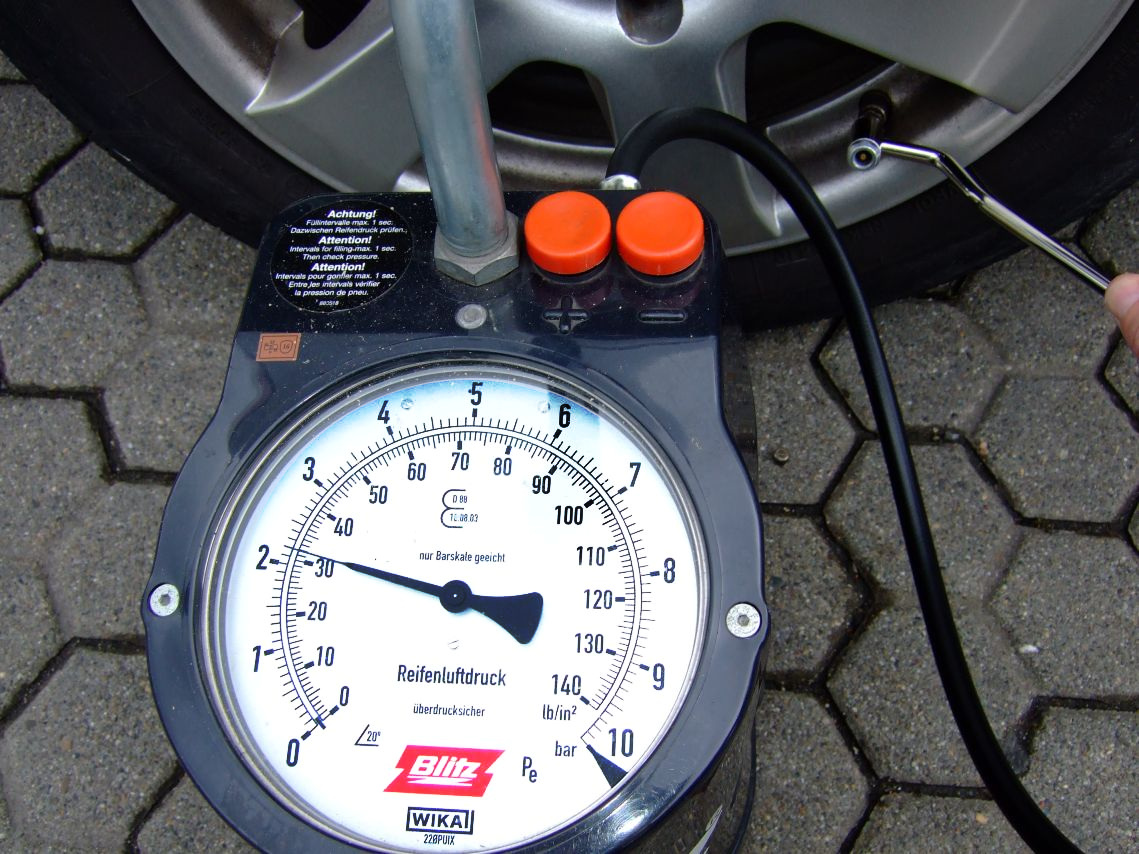
A tire-pressure gauge displaying bar (outside) and psi (inside)

Since tires are rated for specific loads at certain pressure, it is important to keep the pressure of the tire at the optimal amount. The precision of a typical mechanical gauge as shown is ±3 psi (21 kPa). Higher precision gauges with ±1 psi (6.9 kPa) uncertainty can also be obtained. Consumer grade tire pressure gauges typically have maximum readout limits anywhere from 60 psi (414.7 kPa) to 100 psi (689.5 kPa). Commercial grade tire pressure gauges can exceed maximum readout limits of 200 psi (1379 kPa) or more, depending on the application.

== How tire-pressure gauges work ==
Many modern cars now come with built-in tire pressure sensors that allow all four tire pressures to be read simultaneously from inside the car. Before 2005, most on-board tire-pressure monitoring systems (TPMS) used indirect pressure monitoring. The anti-lock brake sensors detect one tire rotating faster than the rest and indicate a low tire pressure to the driver. The problem with this method was that if tires all lost the same pressure then none would show up against the others to indicate a problem. However, research has shown that both direct and indirect tire pressure monitoring systems are equally effective.

Tire-pressure gauges measure air pressure using various methods:

Mechanical methods, like analog and beam gauges, use mechanical pressure sensors. For example, in dial gauges, a diaphragm or piston moves in response to tire pressure, causing the needle on the dial to shift. In beam gauges, the pressure causes a lever to move, which then aligns with a scale to indicate the pressure.

Electronic methods are digital gauges that use sensors to detect tire pressure and convert this information into an electronic signal. This signal is processed and displayed on a digital screen. Electronic gauges may include pressure transducers or strain gauges to detect changes in pressure.

=== Accuracy and Calibration ===
The accuracy of a tire gauge is critical for ensuring proper tire pressure. Most gauges are accurate to within a few PSI or kPa. Regular calibration is necessary to maintain accuracy. Many digital gauges come with automatic calibration features or can be recalibrated manually. Analog gauges may need to be recalibrated by a professional if they show signs of inaccuracy.

=== Usage and Maintenance ===
To use a tire gauge, the valve stem of the tire must be accessed. The gauge is then pressed onto the valve stem, and the pressure reading is taken. For accurate results, it is important to perform this task when the tires are cold, as pressure can increase with heat from driving.

Regular maintenance involves keeping the gauge clean and free from debris. Digital gauges may require battery replacements, while analog gauges should be checked periodically for accuracy and mechanical wear.

== History of tire-pressure gauges ==
SchraderTPMS, formerly known as Schrader, is credited as the first company to create a practical tire-pressure gauge for the consumer market. The device was made by George Schrader after he and his father, August Schrader, invented the Schrader valve and tire valve cap in the 1890s. SchraderTPMS has also been instrumental in the development of TPMS, or Tire Pressure Monitoring Systems, and remains a major manufacturer in the space.

Underinflated tires can lead to a range of issues, from minor problems such as premature tire wear and reduced fuel efficiency to severe consequences like tire failure, tread separation, and blowouts. SchraderTPMS reports that underinflated tires significantly impact road safety, contributing to approximately 250,000 accidents, 33,000 injuries, and 660 fatalities annually.

Because of statistics like these, laws have been put into effect to regulate monitoring tire pressure in vehicles. TPMS is a safety feature integrated into vehicles (or added as an aftermarket component) that continuously monitors tire pressure and alerts the driver if the pressure in one or more tires drops below acceptable levels.

== Types of tire-pressure gauges ==
=== Analog gauges ===
Dial gauges feature a round dial with a needle that moves to indicate the tire pressure. Dial gauges typically use either a bourdon tube system or piston system, which react to the air pressure of the tire in order drive movement of the needle using a mechanical linkage. The pressure is usually displayed in pounds per square inch (PSI), bar, or kilopascals (kPa). Dial gauges are known for their durability and ease of use.

Pen-type gauges, also known as stick gauges, are compact gauges that resemble a pen and have a small dial or scale for reading pressure. They function by using the air pressure of a tire to act against a spring within the gauge to push the scale or dial in correlation with the internal pressure. They are portable and often used for their simplicity and convenience.

=== Digital gauges ===
Electronic gauges use electronic sensors to provide a digital reading of tire pressure. They often come with backlit screens for better visibility and may include additional features such as memory functions for storing previous readings or automatic shutoff to conserve battery life.

Smart gauges are equipped with Bluetooth technology to sync with smartphones, allowing users to monitor tire pressure through a mobile app or other digital software. These smart gauges can provide real-time data and alerts. Smart gauges have gained popularity in commercial spaces, especially aerospace. Companies like Meggitt, a British aerospace manufacturing company, have released long-range wireless pressure gauges for use in commercial aviation. This allows the measurement of tire pressure on aircraft landing gear to be done safely from a distance.

=== Beam gauges ===
Beam gauges use a mechanical lever and a scale to measure tire pressure. They are less common but offer a straightforward, no-frills approach to pressure measurement. Their accuracy depends on the quality of construction.

== Regulations on tire pressure ==
Since September 2007, all new automobiles below 10,000 lb (4,500 kg) in weight sold in the United States are required to incorporate a Tire Pressure Monitoring System, which is capable of monitoring all four tires and simultaneously reporting under-inflation of 25 percent of cold placard pressures in any combination of all four tires. TPMS known as Direct TPMS are capable of TREAD Act legislation requiring simultaneous pressure measurement for each tire pressure.
