= Chronology of Towson University =

This is a timeline of major events and changes related to Towson University and its predecessor institutions Maryland State Normal School (1866–1935), Maryland State Teachers College at Towson (1935–1963), Towson State College (1963–1976), and Towson State University (1976–1997).

== 19th century ==
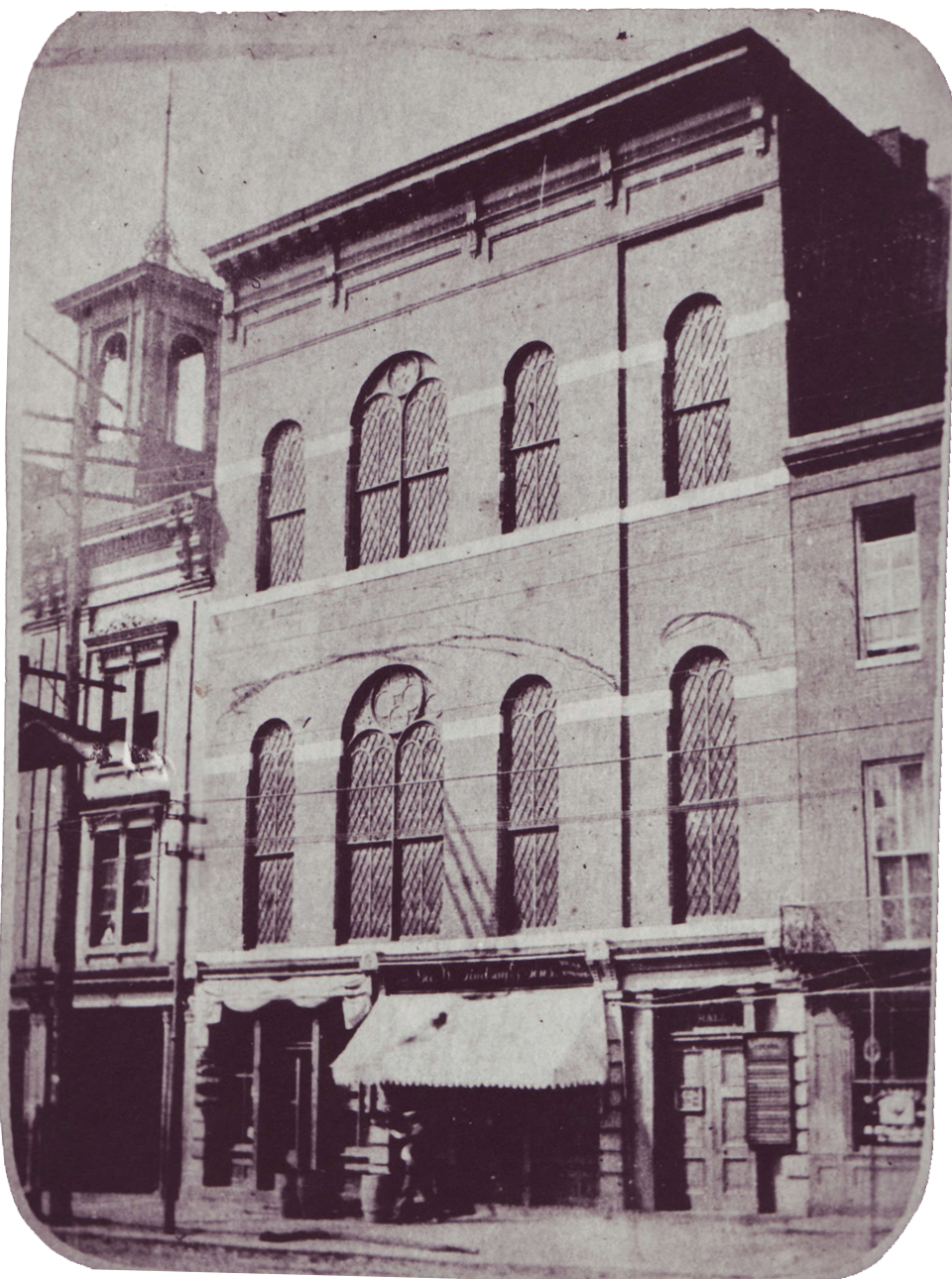
Red Man's Hall

1865

- General Assembly of Maryland enacts legislation establishing a statewide system of free public schools and authorizing the creation of a teacher training school. Maryland is the 7th state to establish such a training school.

1866

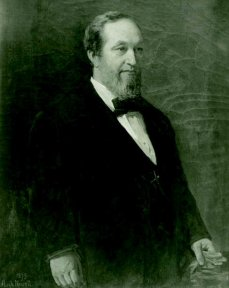
McFadden Alexander Newell

- Maryland State Normal School (MSNS) opens its doors on January 15, 1866 in Red Men's Hall, 24 North Paca Street, Baltimore, Maryland. Eleven students are enrolled on the first day.
- McFadden Alexander Newell is the first principal.
- On June 8, 1866, MSNS holds its first commencement with 16 graduates and ends the academic year with an enrollment of 48 students.

1873

- MSNS moves to the Athenaeum Club Home at Charles and Franklin Streets, Baltimore.

1876

- MSNS moves to a new building at Carrollton and Lafayette Streets on February 29.

1890

- Dr. Elijah Barrett Prettyman is named the second Principal of MSNS. He also serves as the State Superintendent of Education until 1896.

== 1900-1909 ==
1901

- Basketball, a new sport in the United States, is introduced at MSNS for both men and women.

1905

- Dr. George W. Ward (1905–09) becomes the third principal of MSNS.

1909

- Sarah E. Richmond becomes the 5th principal. Her vision for MSNS was to expand the facilities and move the school to Baltimore County.

== 1910-1919 ==
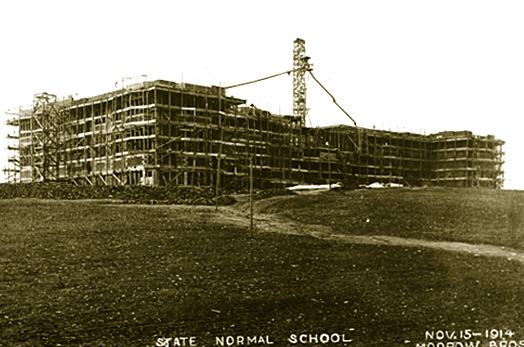
Stephens Hall, under construction in 1914

1910

- Miss Richmond begins a drive for a new location. General Assembly creates a building commission to oversee site selection, budget and design of a new school.

1915

- MSNS moves to the 88-acre (360,000 m^{2}) Towson campus during the summer and classes start in September. There are 3 new buildings, Administration, a classroom, library and office building; Newell Hall, a dormitory for women, and the Power Plant. A fourth building, Glen Esk, the home of the previous owners serves as the home for the Principal.

1917

- Dr. Henry S. West becomes the 6th principal of MSNS. Dr. West hires a business manager to handle the running of the large school facility (grounds, buildings, people).
- The first dean position is created; it is filled by Sarah Richmond.
- The Department of Pedagogy is established with John L. Dunkle as its leader.

== 1920-1929 ==
1920

- Dr. Lida Lee Tall becomes the 7th principal (1920–34) and the first leader to be entitled president (1934–38).

1921

- First student newspaper is issued without titles.

1922

- The Oriole begins publication as the student newspaper.

1924

- Baltimore City Training School for Teachers closes. Their students are sent to MSNS, which effectively doubles the MSNS enrollment.
- Richmond Hall (dormitory) opens in September.

1927

The Towerlight

- Student newspaper is renamed The Towerlight.
- Members of the class of 1931 write a play, The Weavers of the Unbroken Thread, a history of intellectual thought and educational philosophy from Lao-tse to the 1940s.

== 1930-1939 ==
1931

- General Assembly increases the course of study from two to three years.

1933

- New building opens to house the Campus Elementary (Model) School. The building is later named after Libertus Van Bokkelen, State Superintendent of Public Instruction (1864–1867)

1934

- Maryland State Board of Education extends the course of study for elementary teachers to 4 years, leading to a Bachelor of Science in Education.

1935

- General Assembly changes name to Maryland State Teachers College at Towson. (STC) First Bachelor of Science degrees are conferred.

1936

- Within 2 years of granting the B.S. degree, STC has achieved the necessary standards for accreditation by the American Association of Teachers Colleges and the American Council of Education.

1937

- The Glen, a 12-acre (49,000 m^{2}) wooded area, is refurbished with stone pavilions and trails by the Works Progress Administration.

1938

- M. Theresa Wiedefeld becomes the 7th President of the College.

== 1940-1949 ==
1941

- A history of STC entitled "Seventy-five Years of Teacher Education" is published.

1942

- New gymnasium is completed. The building is later named Wiedefeld Gymnasium. (In 1968, it is razed to make way for a new library building).

1946

- Fall - Arts and Sciences program is introduced in the form of a two-year junior college. This is done to assist returning veterans in "jump starting" their education so they can advance to a four-year liberals arts college / university. It is an attempt to move these veterans quickly into jobs.

1947

- Dr. Earle Taylor Hawkins (1947–1969) becomes the 8th President of the College. Education program is expanded to include training of teachers for junior high schools.

1949

- Education program expands to include training of teachers for kindergarten.
- STC receives its first accreditation by the Middle States Association of Colleges and Schools.

== 1950-1959 ==
1951

- Ward and West Halls open as the first dormitories for men.

1957

- Albert S. Cook Library building opens. (In 1969, library will move to a new building and the "old" library building will become the Media Center).
- Prettyman Hall opens as a dormitory for women.

1958

- Towson's newly created Graduate School offers Master's in Education. Program starts with 67 students.

== 1960-1969 ==
1960

- Education program expands to include training of teachers for senior high schools. Two-year junior college is

extended to a 4-year program in the arts & science, leading to a B.S. or B.A. in a particular major.

- Lida Lee Tall Learning Resources Center Building opens. (It is later demolished in 2007 to make way for the new College of Liberal Arts Complex.)

1961

- Theatre Department is established.
- Council on Economic Education in Maryland (CEEM) comes to Towson University. (This organization is now known as the Maryland Council on Economic Education).

1962

- Dowell Health Center opens.

1963

- Name changes from Maryland State Teachers College at Towson to Towson State College (TSC).
- Towson Tiger Mascot is introduced at the fall Homecoming

1964

- Speech-Language-Hearing clinic is established.
- Scarborourgh Hall opens as a dormitory for women.

1965

- Smith Hall opens as Towson's first science building.

1967

- Burdick Hall opens for class use.

1968

- Towson fields its first intercollegiate football team.
- Burdick Hall, named after Dr. William Burdick, the first chair of the Health and Physical Education Department at MSNS, is dedicated.
- Linthicum Hall is dedicated. The building is named after J. Charles Linthicum, a member of the House of Representatives from 1911–1932 and an 1886 graduate of the MSNS.
- First football homecoming game is played. Towson loses to Gallaudet College 25-21.

1969

- Dr. James L. Fisher (1969–1978) becomes the 9th President.
- New Albert S. Cook Library Building opens. The original library building becomes the Media Center.

== 1970-1979 ==
1970

- First Earle T. Hawkins Symposium on International Affairs is held.
- General Services building opens.

1971

- Center for the Asian Arts opens (now known as the Asian Arts and Culture Center).
- Towson acquires Auburn House, former home of Rebecca Ridgely and the Turnbull family.

1972

- Student Day Care Center opens.
- The College Union (now the University Union) opens.
- The Residence Tower and the Administration Building (now Enrollment Services) opens.

1973

- The first Minimester session (January 4 to 31) is scheduled.
- Center for the Arts opens.
- Women's Studies program begins.

1974

- College awards its first B.S. degree in nursing.
- The first "Doc" Minnegan Golf Tournament is held. Donald "Doc" Minnegan was an outstanding coach and the first athletic director at Towson.
- The men's lacrosse team wins the National Championship.

1976

- Towson is granted university status and the name changes to Towson State University (TSU).
- Towson Center opens on October 17 with an exhibition game between the Washington Bullets and the New York Knicks basketball teams.

- WTMD radio begins broadcasting.

1977

- Towson adds several new facilities - Hawkins Hall, Lecture Hall, Psychology Building, and Minnegan Stadium.

1978

- Dr. Joseph Cox serves as acting President from September 1978 to June 1979.
- First Sign language class is offered.

1979

- Dr.Hoke L. Smith (1979–2001) becomes the 10th President of the University.

== 1980-1989 ==
1980

- Towson State University holds the first Maryland Arts Festival.
- Campus hosts first Senior Olympics.
- Applied Mathematics Laboratory is established and is the first such program at the undergraduate level in the country.

1981

- Academic program is restructured into 6 colleges: Allied Health and Physical Education, Education, Fine Arts and Communication, Liberal Arts, Natural and Mathematical Sciences; and the School of Business and Economics.
- Maryland Writing Project is established.

1982

- Master of Science program in Occupational Therapy is established.
- The first President's Award for Distinguished Service to the University is awarded to Mary Catherine Kahl, History Department.

1983

- Computer Science program and B.S. in Computer Science are approved.
- Glen Complex is completed
- First Distinguished Black Marylanders Awards ceremony is held.

1984

- Department of Computer and Information Sciences is established.
- Graduate program in Professional Writing is created.

1985

- Towson is included for the first time in the Best College Survey done by U.S. News & World Report
- Professor Richard Vatz appears to discuss his book on Thomas Szasz on William F. Buckley's nationally syndicated "Firing Line"
- University Police receive the "Governor's Crime Prevention Award." They have continued to receive this award each year to the present.

1987

- Towson begins student exchange program with Carl von Ossietzky University in Oldenburg, Germany. This is now Towson's oldest international student exchange program.

1988

- Towson becomes part of the University System of Maryland.

1989

- Master of Arts in Teaching (M.A.T) and Master of Music in Music Performance are established
- Towson Run Apartments opens.
- Center for the Study of Adult Development and Aging is established. First cultural exchange program with Towson State University and the Leningrad State Conservatory begins . Initially, the program centers on dance, but later expands to include musicians and language teachers.

== 1990-1999 ==
1990

- Institute for Teaching and Research on Women is founded.

1991

- Master of Science in Occupational Therapy is established.

1992

- Towson establishes its first endowed chair in the College of Education after receiving a $1 million gift from Naomi Hentz, class of 1927.

1993

- The Athletic Training Education Program receives certification from the National Athletic Training Association (NATA), becoming the first certified undergraduate program in Maryland.

1994

- Graduate programs in Computer Science and in Theatre Arts are established

1995

- Master's degree in Occupational Therapy is offered via the interactive video network.
- John Glover, class of 1969, wins a Tony Award for Love! Valour! Compassion!

1996

- Towson State University gets its own zip code - 21252-0001.
- Administrative Data Processing and Academic Computing are merged to form Computing and Network Services (CANS).
- Regional Economic Studies Institute (RESI) comes to Towson State University.
- College of Allied Health Sciences and Physical Education changes its name to College of Health Science Professions.
- Physical Education Department changes its name to Department of Kinesiology.
- U.S. News & World Report ranks Towson second in the "Most Efficient Schools" and fourth in the "Best Sticker Price" category for institutions in the north.
- Student Government Association donates Tiger statue to the University.

1997

- Towson State University is renamed Towson University and adopts a new logo.
- College of Natural and Mathematical Sciences changes its name to College of Science and Mathematics.
- Dan Jones, Dean of the College of Liberal Arts, receives the "Maryland Association for Higher Education (MAHE) Outstanding Educator Award."
- World Cello Congress II, organized by Towson University, is held in St. Petersburg, Russia.
- Gerontology Program is established.
- The Fitness/Wellness Center, a collaborative effort between Towson and St. Joseph's Hospital, opens.
- Installation begins for high-speed internet service to Towson's residence halls and the Burkshire.
- Women's Center receives the "Governor's Award for Outstanding Contributions to the Field of Victim's Rights and Services."
- Ethel Nowell Andrews, class of 1909, dies. She was 108 years old and had long been considered the University's oldest graduate.

1998

- Towson is ranked among the top 10 public institutions in the North by U.S. News & World Report.
- Graduate program in Women's Studies is established.
- Occupational Therapy's graduate program is ranked 13th in the U.S. News & World Report's "America's Best Graduate Schools."
- Master of Science in Applied and Industrial Mathematics and Master of Science in Information Technology Management accept students into their programs.

1999

- Center for Applied Information Technology is created.
- Dance Team wins the Division I National Championship.
- College of Education receives a national award for teacher training.

== 2000-present ==
2000

- Towson hosts the World Cello Congress III from May 29 to June 4. Yo-Yo Ma is the featured performer.
- Millennium Hall, a privatized apartment complex for resident students, opens.
- Kiplinger's Personal Finance Magazine names Towson University to its list of "100 Top Values in Education".
- TU's academic advising programs for freshman and transfers earn an "Outstanding Institutional Advising Program Award" from the National Academic Advising Association.

2001

- Dr. Mark L. Perkins (July 2001- April 2002) becomes Towson's 11th President.
- Dr. Dan Jones serves as interim President from April 2002 to June 2003.
- Towson inaugurates doctoral programs in Audiology and in Occupational Science.
- Towson University's chapter of Beta Gamma Sigma, National Business Honor Society, wins the 2001 Gold Chapter Award.
- Dr. Alex Storrs, Astronomy, discovers a companion to Asteroid 107 Camilla, only the fifth such companion ever found.
- Schuerholz Park for baseball is dedicated on April 29.
- Towson is ranked 8th in the "Top Public Northern Universities - Master's" by U.S. News & World Report.
- Towson's chapter of Kappa Delta Pi is awarded an Achieving Chapter Excellence Award.

2002

- Towson University is named a Center of Academic Excellence in Information Assurance Education by the National Security Agency.

2003

- Dr. Robert L. Caret becomes the 12th President of the University.
- 7800 York Road building opens as the home to the Department of Computer and Information Science, College of Extended Programs, College of Graduate Education & Research, and the English Language Center.
- Barry Levinson, filmmaker, is honored with the Distinguished Lifetime Achievement Award from the Departments of Mass Communications and Communications Studies and Electronic Media and Film.
- Towson Stadium is renamed Johnny Unitas Stadium.

2006

- The tiger statue is vandalized in front on Cook Library and is removed.

2007

- The new bronze tiger statue is unveiled outside of Stephens Hall.
- Lida Lee Tall structure is razed to make way for the new College of Liberal Arts complex.

2008

- Tubman House and Paca House open as the first phase of the West Village complex, August 2008. A university-wide contest was held for the naming of the two new buildings. The names were chosen in honor of Harriet Tubman and William Paca.
- The addition to the Towsontown Garage is completed.

== See also ==
- Towson University alumni
- Towson University sports venues
