= WTMD =

Coordinates: 39.396°N 76.608°W

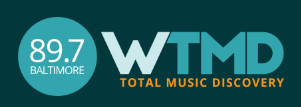
- Towson, Maryland; United States
- Broadcast area: Baltimore metropolitan area
- Frequency: 89.7 MHz
- Branding: 89.7 WTMD

Programming
- Format: Adult album alternative

Ownership
- Owner: Baltimore Public Media; (WYPR License Holding, LLC)

History
- First air date: February 12, 1976; 50 years ago
- Former call signs: WCVT (1976–1991)
- Call sign meaning: Where Towson Makes a Difference

Technical information
- Licensing authority: FCC
- Facility ID: 67461
- Class: B1
- ERP: 7,400 watts
- HAAT: 122 metres (400 ft)

Links
- Public license information: Public file; LMS
- Webcast: Listen Live
- Website: www.wtmd.org

WTMD (89.7 FM) is a non-commercial public radio station licensed to Towson, Maryland, and serving the Baltimore metropolitan area. It broadcasts an adult album alternative (AAA) radio format and is owned by Baltimore Public Media, along with NPR affiliate WYPR 88.1 FM. It holds periodic on-air fundraisers and seeks donations on its website.

WTMD has an effective radiated power (ERP) of 10,000 watts. It uses a directional antenna. The transmitter is on Olympic Place in Towson. WTMD broadcasts using HD Radio technology.

== History ==
=== Carrier current station ===
For most of its time on the air, WTMD was the college radio station of Towson State University. It has its origins in a network of closed-circuit carrier current transmitters on the Towson campus, inaugurated in Spring 1972. Although carrier current stations are not licensed by the Federal Communications Commission (FCC), the operation adopted the unofficial call sign of WVTS ("Voice of Towson State") as a familiar form of identification.

Efforts began to build out an FM station, although it was hampered by a lack of available frequencies as other educational broadcasters built their stations first. A plan to partner with Morgan State University to launch a shared station (later to become WEAA) fell through. A 1973 letter to The Towerlight was reflective of the overall mood surrounding the station, bemoaning the fact that the largest mass communications program in the state had only a carrier current station for training students who planned careers in media. The author described the carrier current station as a "sophisticated intercom." There were also concerns about poor news and events coverage, and a lack of professionalism on the part of airstaff.

=== FM license ===
In 1974, the FCC granted Towson State a construction permit to build an FM station on 89.7 MHz. This station was initially given the call sign WCVT ("Communications Voice of Towson"). It signed on the air on February 12, 1976. It had a typical college radio format of primarily progressive rock and a variety of specialty shows. The carrier current station was also renamed WCVT and became a training ground for the FM station, greatly improving its on-air quality. WCVT's eclectic music found a small but loyal audience. The station was recognized by the Baltimore City Paper in 1988 as the city's best.

WCVT upgraded to 10,000 watts in 1981. Towson State began directly funding the station in 1988 with the intention of hiring professional management, which it did in the same year.

=== Smooth Jazz ===
In 1991, faced with an audience that was unsustainably small for its funding needs, WCVT flipped to smooth jazz and light adult contemporary as "89.7 The Breeze." It changed its call sign to WTMD. Despite the apparent meaning of "Towson, Maryland", the call letters began as an initialism for "Where Towson Makes a Difference." (The letters have also been backronymed into the station's current slogan, "Total Music Discovery".) Students protested the loss of their musical outlet, arguing that since they were still a major funding source, WTMD should play what they wanted. General manager Jim English put it bluntly to the Baltimore Sun: "Nobody's listening."

Management contended that the station's primary goal was to teach broadcasting, not entertain students, and it needed to switch to a more accessible format to resolve persistent revenue shortfalls. Full-service NPR member station WJHU (88.1 FM) had four times the audience with a comparable signal.

=== Adult Alternative ===
After eleven years of what Sun media reporter David Folkenflik derisively referred to as "low-calorie" elevator music, WTMD flipped to adult album alternative (AAA) – a mix of indie rock, alternative rock, folk and alternative country – on December 3, 2002. Station management indicated they were impressed by the success of stations such as WXPN and KCRW, and sought a musical format not otherwise accessible in Baltimore. At the time, WEAA, WJHU, and Washington's WPFW also devoted at least part of their broadcast days to jazz. The AAA format has achieved a similar level of success, and WTMD developed a reputation as a strong supporter of the local music scene.

WTMD concurrently moved from faculty oversight in the Department of Electronic Media and Film to direct management by the university's communications department. The station employed an all-professional office and air staff, although Towson students served as interns and worked their way into on-air positions. In 2014, the station's management was delegated to the affiliated nonprofit Towson University Public Media, though the university retained ownership of the station and its assets.

The carrier current network became known as WTSR ("Towson State Radio") in 1981, and gradually became more eclectic after the FM station dropped progressive rock. It was shut down in 2004; WTSR moved online and still exists today as XTSR.

=== Change in ownership ===
In May 2021, Your Public Radio Corporation, the owner of WYPR, reached an agreement to acquire the station for $3 million. WTMD retains its format and programming. The acquisition closed on November 10, 2021, after receiving Federal Communications Commission approval.

In 2024, Your Public Media changed its name to Baltimore Public Media.

=== First Thursday Concerts in the Park ===
WTMD produces First Thursday Concerts in the Park, a series of six free after work shows at West Mount Vernon Park in downtown Baltimore, and starting in 2014, Canton Waterfront Park. Artists like The Damnwells, Joan Osborne, Los Lonely Boys, LP, Steve Forbert, The Colour, The Young Dubliners and others have performed, attracting crowds of about 3,000.

The 2013 calendar included performances by artists The Lone Below, Alpha Rev, The Wild Feathers, and the Kopecky Family Band. As of 2013, First Thursday attendance has dramatically increased, doubling from previous years to draw 6,000 to 7,000 attendees.

The 2014 calendar included artists such as Joan Osborne, Joseph Arthur, Marah, Los Lonely Boys, Spanish Gold, LP, Grizfolk, Strand of Oaks, Lydia Loveless, Moon Taxi, The Whigs, JD McPherson, The Hold Steady, Hamilton Leithauser, and Among Wolves.

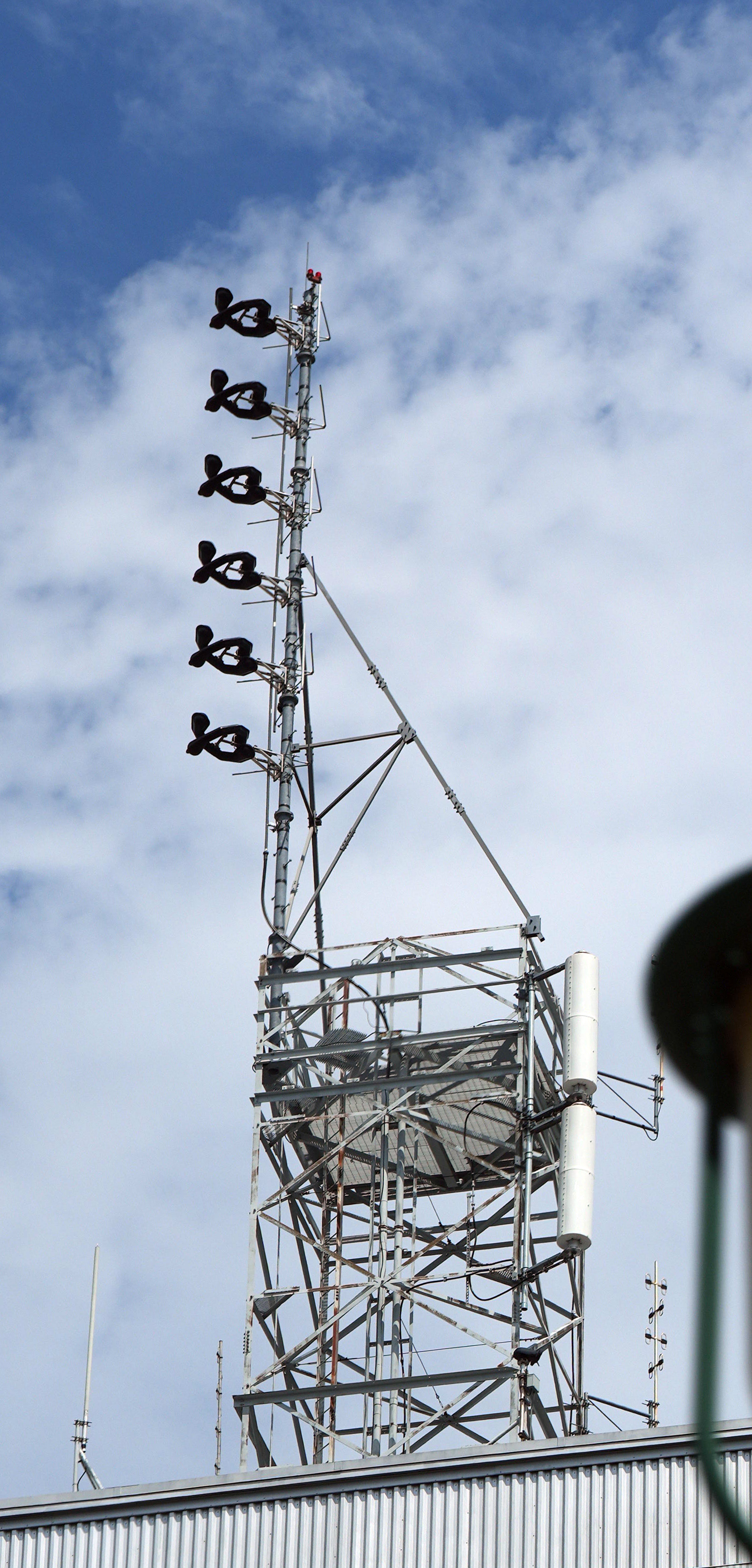
The WTMD transmitter antenna

=== Relationship with Washington ===
WTMD partnered with WAMU in Washington, D.C. whereby WAMU rebroadcast WTMD on its second HD Radio digital subchannel. This brought back independent music radio to Washington for the first time since WHFS dropped its alternative rock format in 2005. This partnership was recognized by FCC Commissioner Robert M. McDowell in his remarks when the commission voted to make HD Radio permanent.

WTMD was simulcast full-time on WAMU-HD2 until September 2007, when WAMU removed all music programming from its primary signal and flipped the HD2 subchannel to Americana and bluegrass-formatted "Bluegrass Country". The simulcast moved to overnights and weekends on WAMU-HD3; in 2010, the WTMD-programmed blocks were flipped to content from XPoNential Radio.

WTMD also broadcast on FM translator W288BS, located in the Washington suburb of Great Falls, Virginia on 105.5 FM. This translator was fed by WAMU's HD signal and began relaying Bluegrass Country in October 2008.
