= Hoke L. Smith =

Tenth president of Towson University

- Born: May 7, 1931; Galesburg, Illinois
- Died: March 27, 2004 (aged 72); Baltimore, Maryland
- Occupations: President, Towson University

Hoke L. Smith (May 7, 1931 – March 27, 2004) was the tenth president of Towson University.

Early in Smith's administration, he focused on Towson's status as a "comprehensive university." One of the first changes was the a new governance structure and the establishment of six colleges. With public higher education seriously under-funded, Smith set out to strengthen alumni and development programs as a source of alternative funding.

During his administration, Towson added 20 new undergraduate programs, 19 new graduate programs and the 3 doctoral programs. In 1997, Smith led Towson to its latest name change to Towson University.

On March 27, 2004, Smith died of liver cancer at his home in Baltimore.

Preceded by James Fisher	Towson University president 1979–2001	Succeeded by Mark Perkins
