= Daisy, Maryland =

Unincorporated community in Maryland, United States

- Location in Maryland
- Coordinates: 39°17′38″N 77°4′8″W
- Country: United States of America
- State: Maryland
- County: Howard
- Established: 1882
- Elevation: 551 ft (168 m)

Population (1904)
  - Total: 28
- Time zone: UTC-5 (EST)
  - Summer (DST): UTC-4 (EDT)
- Area code: 240 and 301

Daisy is an unincorporated community located at the northwest tip of Howard County, Maryland, United States.

== History ==
A very large tract of land in the area that became Daisy was patented to Captain Richard Warfield in 1763. The Oakdale manor slave plantation was built on the site in 1838 by Albert Gallatin Warfield and, as of 1940, overlooked a remaining 1,300 acres (5.3 km^{2}) of the original tract.

Senator Arthur Pue Gorman's daughter, Grace (1871–1958), who went by the name "Daisy", lived at the historic Overlook farm house in North Laurel. Daisy, Maryland was named after her in 1882. A postal office operated in the community from March 24, 1882, to August 31, 1905.

The current Daisy United Methodist Church property, eligible for the National Register of Historic Places, was built in 1906 on 2.25 acres (0.91 ha) of land acquired in 1876 "to be used as a school house for colored children and also a house of public worship for the use of the colored members of the M.E. church of the neighborhood".

By 1940, the population of Daisy reached 25. The farming community was active in the mid-20th century, with a general store, schoolhouse, and Good Templars Hall, though diminished in the 1970s as agricultural profits fell and families moved to larger towns. The Daisy Garage was established in 1959 by former Howard County Commissioner Robey Mullinix.

== Notable people ==
- Roby H. Mullinix (1895–1965), Howard County Commissioner (1949–1954), Planning Commissioner, Howard County Court Clerk (1954–1962)
- George Washington Ward (1867–1932) was the third principal of Maryland State Normal School (now Towson University).
- Edwin Warfield (1848–1920), the 45th Governor of Maryland, grew up at the Oakdale Manor built in 1838.

== Today ==
The Daisy General Store and Outpost joined the Daisy Schoolhouse in 2012 on Preservation Howard County's top endangered sites list. The nonprofit organization pursues historical and cultural preservation in the county. The school is awaiting reconstruction on museum property in West Friendship. The outpost remained on the list in 2014 and 2015.
