= Mary Theresa =

Mary Theresa is a feminine given name. Notable people with the name include:

- Mary Theresa Carver, mother of Mary Curzon, Baroness Curzon of Kedleston
- Mary Theresa Dudzik (1860–1918), American Roman Catholic nun
- Mary Theresa Eleanor Higgins, birth name of Mary Higgins Clark (1927–2020), American author of suspense novels
- Mary Theresa Glindon (born 1957), English politician
- Mary Theresa Hart (1872–1942), American artist and illustrator
- Mary Theresa Ledóchowska (1863–1922), Polish Roman Catholic nun
- Mary Theresa Olivia Cornwallis-West, birth name of Daisy, Princess of Pless (1873–1943), Welsh writer, socialite, and wartime nurse
- Mary Theresa Schmich (born 1953), American journalist
- Mary Theresa Vidal (1815–1873), English-born Australian novelist
- Mary Theresa Wiedefeld (1886–1983), American educator and academic
