= Oakdale Manor =

Historic house in Maryland, United States

- Oakdale
- U.S. National Register of Historic Places
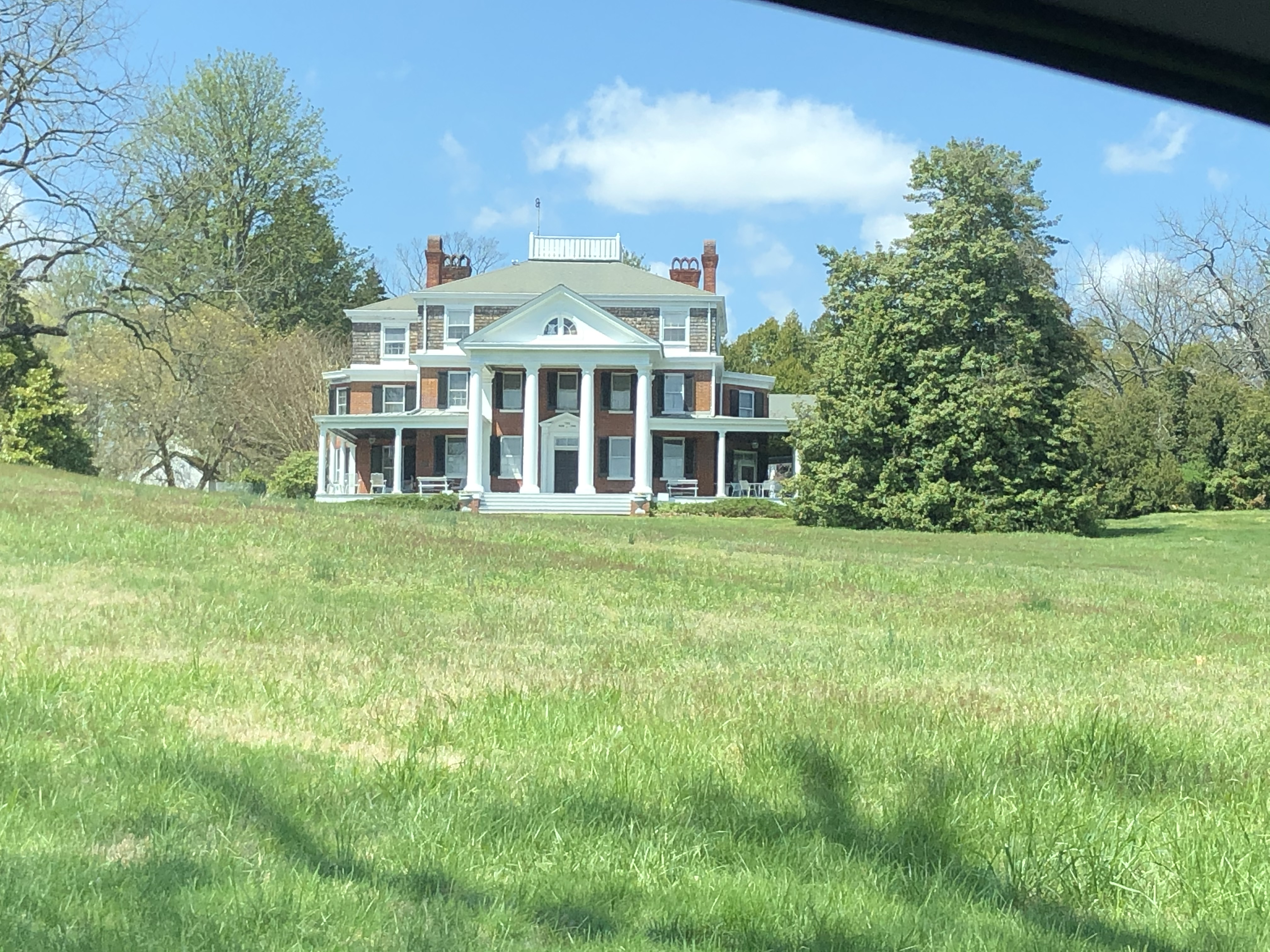

- Location within Maryland Location within the United States
- Location: 16449 Edwin Warfield Road, Woodbine, Maryland
- Coordinates: 39°17′22.38″N 77°04′57.67″W
- Built: 1838
- Architectural style: Brick Palladian
- NRHP reference No.: 14001041

Oakdale is a historic plantation located in Daisy, (Woodbine) Howard County, Maryland, former home of Maryland Governor Edwin Warfield.

Oakdale resides on a land grant surveyed by William Shipley in Feb 16, 1765 named "Fredericks Burgh". The land was patented in March 1765 by Henry Griffith and repatented as "Addition to Part of Fredericks Borough" Oakdale was built in 1838 by Albert Galltin Warfield, great grandson of Captain Benjamin Warfield of Cherry Grove and his wife Margret Gassaway Watkins. In 1891 Edwin Warfield moved to the 265 acre Oakdale Manor after the death of his father and expanded the building to over twenty rooms. The property includes a pre-1838 log slave quarters, tenant house, carriage house, smokehouse, barn, and an Octagon glass greenhouse. Oakdale was the site of the reunion of Company A of the Confederate States of America which he served. In 1904, Warfield became governor of Maryland. The Governor hosted troops under the command of his appointee, Adjutant-General of the Maryland National Guard Clinton L. Riggs at Oakdale in 1907. Warfield's grandson Edwin Warfield III sold the manor in the mid-1970s

The Manor was subdivided to 54 acres and acquired by James F Jackson III who conducted a restoration in 1974. The house was purchased by Ted Mariani in 1980 who expanded the property with a solarium. In 2014 he announced plans to convert the farm use from winter wheat, soybean, corn and timothy crops to a class II winery and agritourism location for events up to 150 persons. The property was listed on the National Register of Historic Places in December 2014.

== See also ==
- List of Howard County properties in the Maryland Historical Trust
- Daisy, Maryland
- Sunnyside (Woodbine, Maryland)
- Hobson's Choice (Woodbine, Maryland)
- John T. Warfield House
- National Register of Historic Places listings in Howard County, Maryland
