= Henry Skinner West =

American educator (1870–1961)

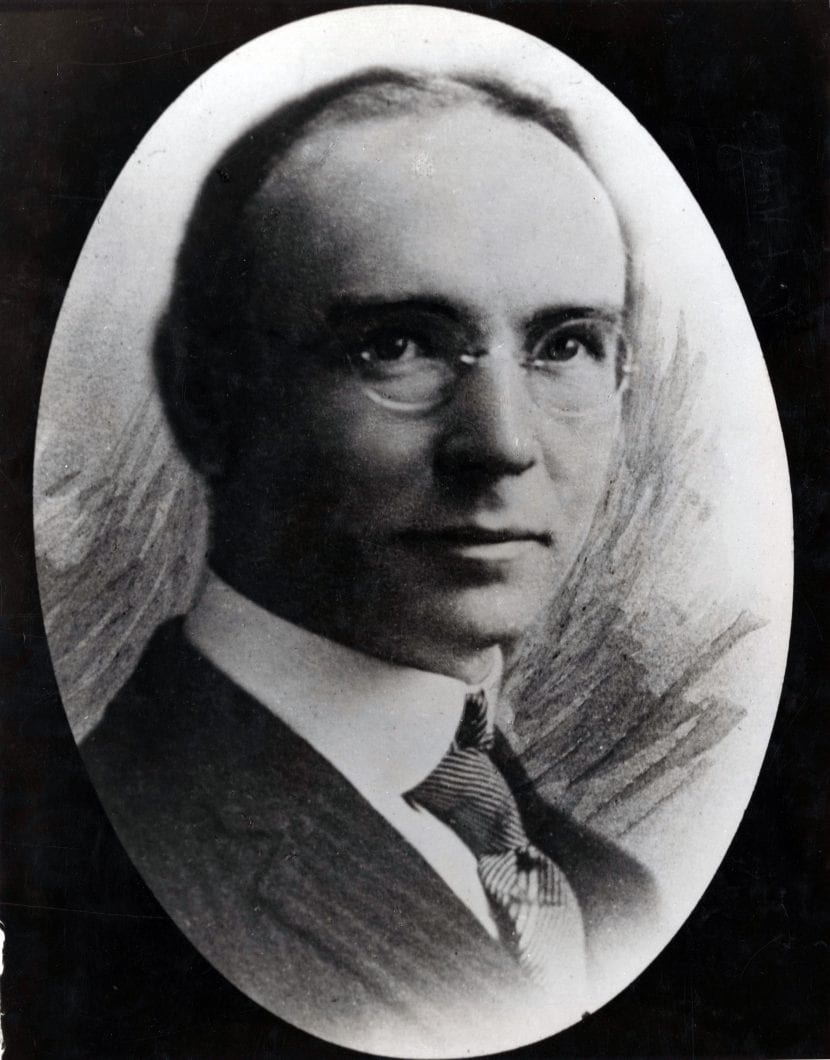
- West, c. 1919
- Born: December 23, 1870; Baltimore, Maryland, U.S.
- Died: April 9, 1961 (aged 90); Evanston, Illinois, U.S.
- Education: Baltimore City College; University of Maryland; Johns Hopkins University (BA, PhD)
- Occupation: Educator
- Spouse: Anne Brown Downman (m. 1900)
- Children: 3

Henry Skinner West (December 23, 1870 – April 9, 1961) was the fifth principal of Maryland State Normal School (now Towson University).

== Early life ==
Henry Skinner West was born on December 23, 1870, in Baltimore. He attended schools in Maryland. He graduated from both the Baltimore City College and the University of Maryland in 1890. He graduated with a Bachelor of Arts in 1893 and a PhD in 1899 from Johns Hopkins University.

== Career ==
From 1890 to 1891, West taught at a Baltimore elementary school. He then worked as a professor at Baltimore City College from 1894 to 1897 and again in 1900. He was an instructor at Johns Hopkins University from 1899 to 1900. He was principal at Western High School from 1900 to 1906. West was the special assistant superintendent for schools in Baltimore from 1906 to 1911. He then worked for Johns Hopkins summer schools for teachers from 1911 to 1915. West was professor of education and director of secondary schools in Cincinnati, Ohio, from 1912 to 1917. During this time, he was a professor of education at the University of Cincinnati.

In 1917, Dr. West was appointed as principal of the Maryland State Normal School (now Towson University). During his tenure, enrollment at the school dropped severely due to World War I and funding and dormity space for the school was inadequate and the teachers were poorly paid. In 1920, West left his position to become the superintendent of schools in Baltimore. He held this position for five years. He resigned following criticism about his administration. As principal, he held an enrollment campaign to attract more students, reorganized the school administration and introduced the first summer session in 1918. He helped Maryland adopt a system for teacher certification.

In 1926, West went to the University of Miami in Florida to work as a professor of education. In 1928, he became its first dean of the College of Liberal Arts. He also became the dean of the College of Arts and Sciences in 1929. He also taught at the University of North Carolina in the summer months. West retired in 1942 and was named dean emeritus at the University of Miami for both the School of Education and the College of Arts and Sciences.

== Personal life ==
West married Anne Brown Downman on November 17, 1900. They had two sons and one daughter, Henry D., Julian S. and Harriet.

West died on April 9, 1961, at his home in Evanston, Illinois.

== Legacy ==
In 1955, the Henry S. West Laboratory School was named in his honor.

Preceded by Sarah Richmond	Towson University principal 1917-1920	Succeeded by Lida Lee Tall
