= Earle Hawkins =

Earle T. Hawkins
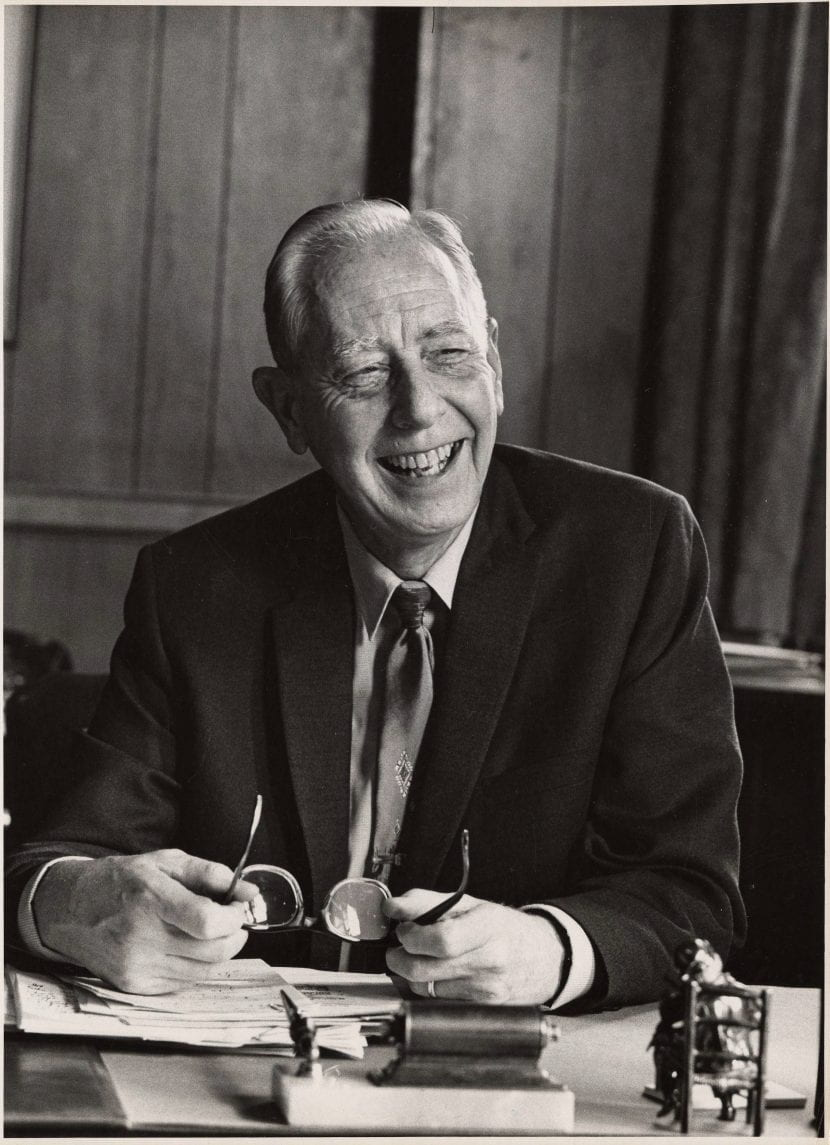
- Born: 1903
- Died: 1972
- Occupation(s): President, Towson State College

Earle Taylor Hawkins (March 5, 1903 – June 1972) was the eighth president of Towson State College (now Towson University).

Earle Hawkins advanced through the state educational system from the level of teacher to top supervisory positions. His administration was affected by the phenomenal growth in higher education. In 1947, student enrollment totaled 600. When Dr. Hawkins retired, enrollment had risen to over 8,000 day and evening students. During his presidency, Towson added a full range of baccalaureate programs in the arts and sciences, instituted evening and summer programs and undertook an ambitious building program. Indicative of the school's growth and broadening scope was the change in name in 1963 from State Teachers College to Towson State College. Towson had become the second largest public institution of higher education in Maryland. Dr. Hawkins gave Towson 22 years of leadership.

Earle Hawkins served as 1st Vice President of the Board of Directors of the National Conference on Citizenship in 1960. He was first appointed to the board of directors in 1953, having served on the Attorney General's Citizenship Committee in 1950

Preceded by Mary Theresa Wiedefeld	Towson University president 1947-1969	Succeeded by James Fisher
