= George W. Ward =

Third principal of Maryland State Normal School

George Washington Ward
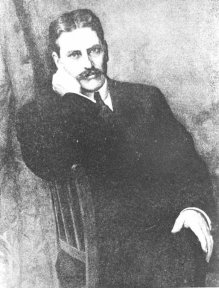
- Born: 1867; Daisy, Maryland
- Died: 1932 (aged 64–65)
- Occupations: Principal, Maryland State Normal School

George Washington Ward (1867–1932) was the third principal of Maryland State Normal School (now Towson University).

Ward was a product of Maryland education, unlike his predecessors, having attended a one-room school in Daisy, Maryland. He received his Bachelor of Arts and Masters from Western Maryland College and his Ph.D. from Johns Hopkins University. In 1905, Ward was appointed Principal of MSNS. He served for 4 years and then resigned to engage in the brokerage business. Important developments during his tenure were broadening of the teacher training program, establishment of a departmental structure for the faculty, and the hiring of a librarian to organize and expand the library.

Preceded by Elijah Barrett Prettyman	Towson University principal 1905-1909	Succeeded by Sarah Richmond
