= Elijah Barrett Prettyman =

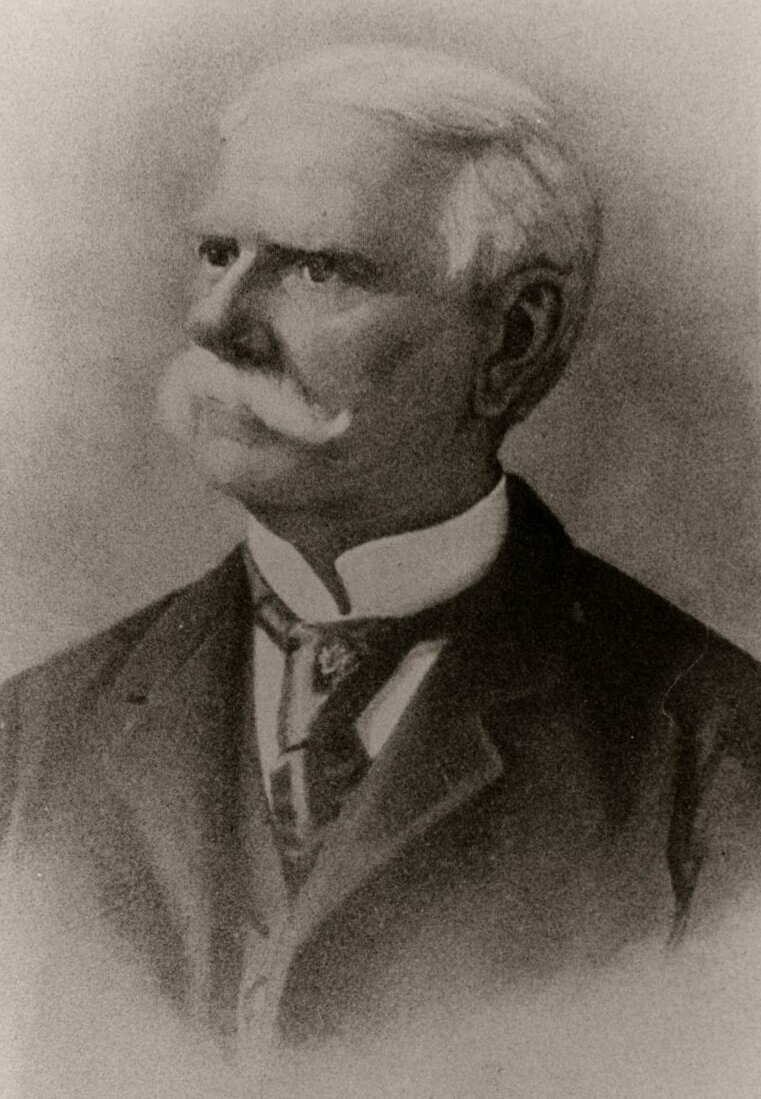
- Born: February 20, 1830; Williamsport, Pennsylvania
- Died: December 9, 1907 (aged 77); Rockville, Maryland
- Education: Dickinson College
- Occupations: Maryland State Superintendent of Public Instruction; Principal, Maryland State Normal School
- Political party: Democratic
- Spouse: Lydia Forrest Johnston (m. 1855)
- Children: 6

Elijah Barrett Prettyman (1830–1907) was the second principal of Maryland State Normal School (now Towson University).

== Biography ==
Elijah Barrett Prettyman was born in Williamsport, Pennsylvania on February 20, 1830. He graduated from Dickinson College. He was a teacher and principal in Anne Arundel County for over 15 years. He later became the State Superintendent of Public Instruction and Principal of the Normal School.

He married Lydia Forrest Johnston on June 6, 1855, and they had six children.

A Democrat, he was elected clerk of the Montgomery County court and served for 22 years.

He died at his home in Rockville, Maryland on December 9, 1907.

Preceded by McFadden Alexander Newell	Towson University principal 1890-1905	Succeeded by George W. Ward
