= Marc Steiner =

American radio talk show and podcast host

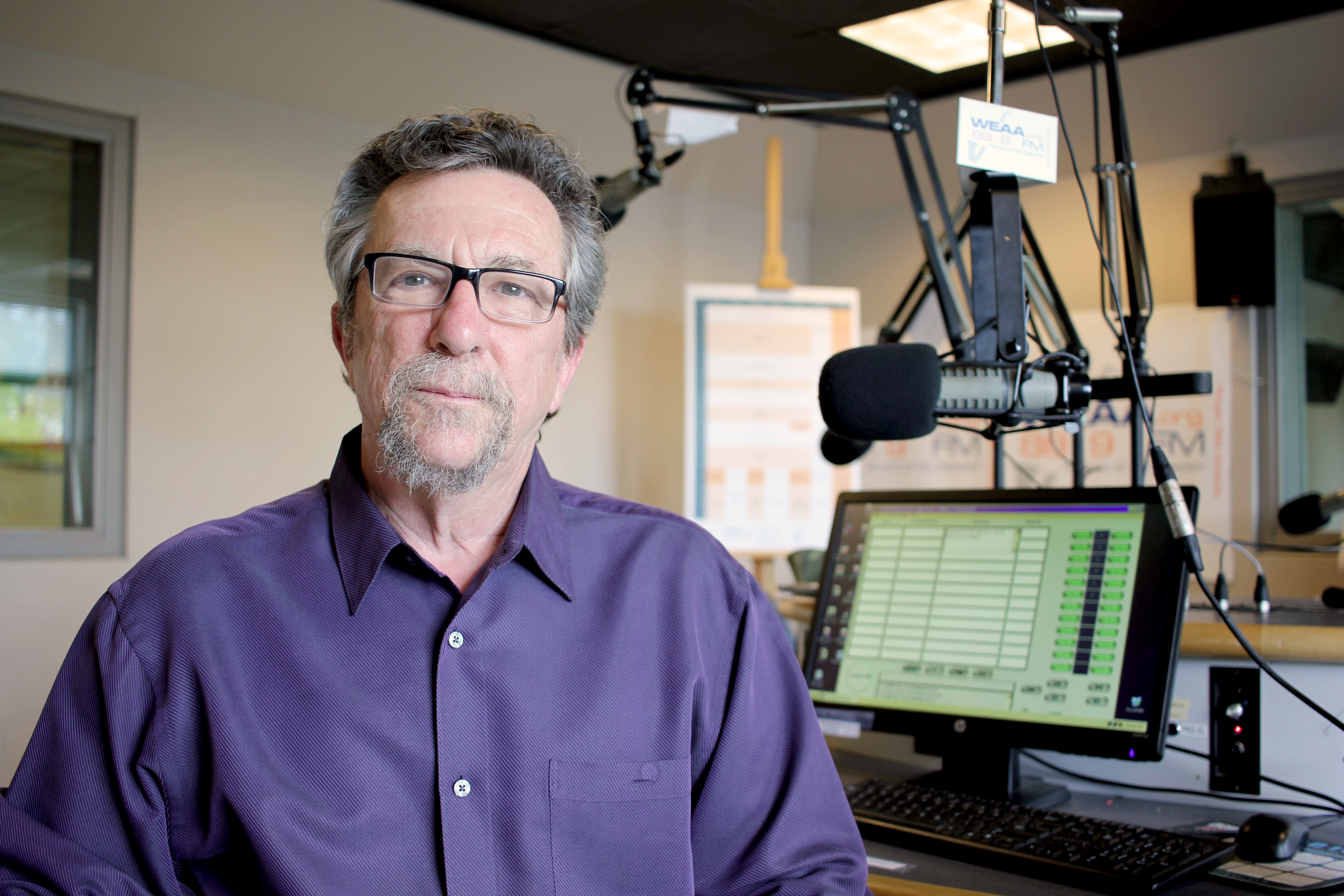
- Marc Steiner in the WEAA 88.9FM studio in 2015
- Occupation: Radio personality
- Awards: Peabody

Marc Steiner is an American radio talk show and podcast host.

He currently hosts The Marc Steiner Show. He previously worked for WYPR (and its predecessor, WJHU) from 1993 until parting with the organization on February 1, 2008, and on WEAA 88.9FM, an NPR affiliate station, in Baltimore, Maryland, from 2008 to 2017. In 2018 he started The Marc Steiner Show on The Real News Network where he also works as a host and an author.

As a teenager, Steiner was active in the civil rights movement, joining protests organized by both the Congress of Racial Equality, the Student Nonviolent Coordinating Committee, and the Civil Interest Group in Maryland.

He also operates his own production company, the Center for Emerging Media. CEM produced the Peabody award-winning series Just Words, which featured the voices and stories of working people in Baltimore often relegated to statistics.

== Personal life ==
Steiner lives with his wife, Valerie, and resides in Sparks, Maryland. He has three daughters, four grandchildren, and two great-grandchildren.
