= The Towerlight =

Student newspaper at Towson University

- "Towson's campus and community news source"
- Type: College newspaper
- Format: Online
- School: Towson University
- Owner(s): Baltimore Student Media, Inc.
- Editor-in-chief: Meghan Hudson
- Website: thetowerlight.com

The Towerlight is the online independent student newspaper at Towson University. It is run by Towson students, and frequently updates the campus on events and news. In the summer of 2008, Baltimore Student Media (BSM) was established by The Towerlight's staff and general manager. BSM is a non-profit organization dedicated to providing support for aspiring student journalists, photographers, videographers and graphic designers. In July 2008, Towson University agreed to sign over its rights to The Towerlight to BSM.

== History ==
The first issue of The Oriole

According to the first issue of The Oriole, the very first newspapers were published in 1921 with no names, in order to advertise the school and increase enrollment. There were only two issues published in 1921, and the first monthly publication was created in January 1922.

Also in the first issue, then-principal Lida Lee Tall wrote that the purpose of the newspaper was:

- To give the students a medium for telling their life and their ideals to all groups of interested students in the state.
- To give the school its opportunity to place its stamp upon education.
- To give the state an opportunity to know what one of its normal schools is doing and aiming to do.
- To send a message out into the schools of other states.

The original name (The Oriole) was a suggestion from one of the seniors at the time, Ellen Hutchinson. There were a pool of names suggested, and the students voted unanimously for the name.

In March 2020, The Towerlight ended weekly print publication and fully transitioned online. The final special editions are the "Spring 2020", "Summer 2020", "Fall 2020", "Spring 2021", and "Fall 2021" editions.

== Notable coverage ==
- In March 2020, The Towerlight editor-in-chief Bailey Hendricks published a breaking news story that nine Towson University members had been told to self-isolate after COVID-19 exposure, the first known exposures at Towson University. The Towerlight was the first to report the information, before the University itself, attracting widespread coverage. The Towerlight released an informational edition next, titled "Towson Responds to Coronavirus Outbreak", and an abrupt mid-semester final edition, "Towson's Lost Semester".
- In September 2009, The Towerlight published a weekly column titled "The Bed Post", which received widespread coverage following the resignation of the paper's then editor-in-chief.
- On April 17, 2007, one day after the Virginia Tech massacre, the staff at The Towerlight decided to make a special edition of the paper that recorded the reactions and sentiment towards what happened at Virginia Tech.
- On April 9, 2002, the Towerlight staff—then run by editor-in-chief Jennifer Hykes—put out a special edition covering the controversial resignation of the University's 11th President, Dr. Mark L. Perkins. The issue, entitled "Promise Unfulfilled: Perkins Resigns", covered student, staff and faculty reactions, the historic events that led to Perkins's eventual resignation, as well as all of the highlights of Perkins's tumultuous run as president. The issue was recognized with a Region Two Mark of Excellence Award from the Society of Professional Journalists.

== Recognition ==
The Society of Professional Journalists named The Towerlight No. 1 in its region and No. 2 nationally in the category "Best All-Around Non-Daily Student Newspaper Newspaper" at its annual conference in Houston in 2002.

== Notable alumni ==
- Brian Stelter – Senior media correspondent for CNN and the host of Reliable Sources, former The New York Times reporter; was The Towerlight's editor-in-chief from 2005 to 2007.
- Paul McMullen – The editor of The Catholic Review and reporter for The Baltimore Sun
- Robert Richard Hieronimus – artist, author and radio host, was a The Towerlight columnist in the early 1960s.
- Jack L. Chalker – Class of 1966, author of almost 50 novels, was a Towerlight theater critic.
