= Woodbine, Maryland =

Unincorporated community in Maryland, United States

- Unincorporated community
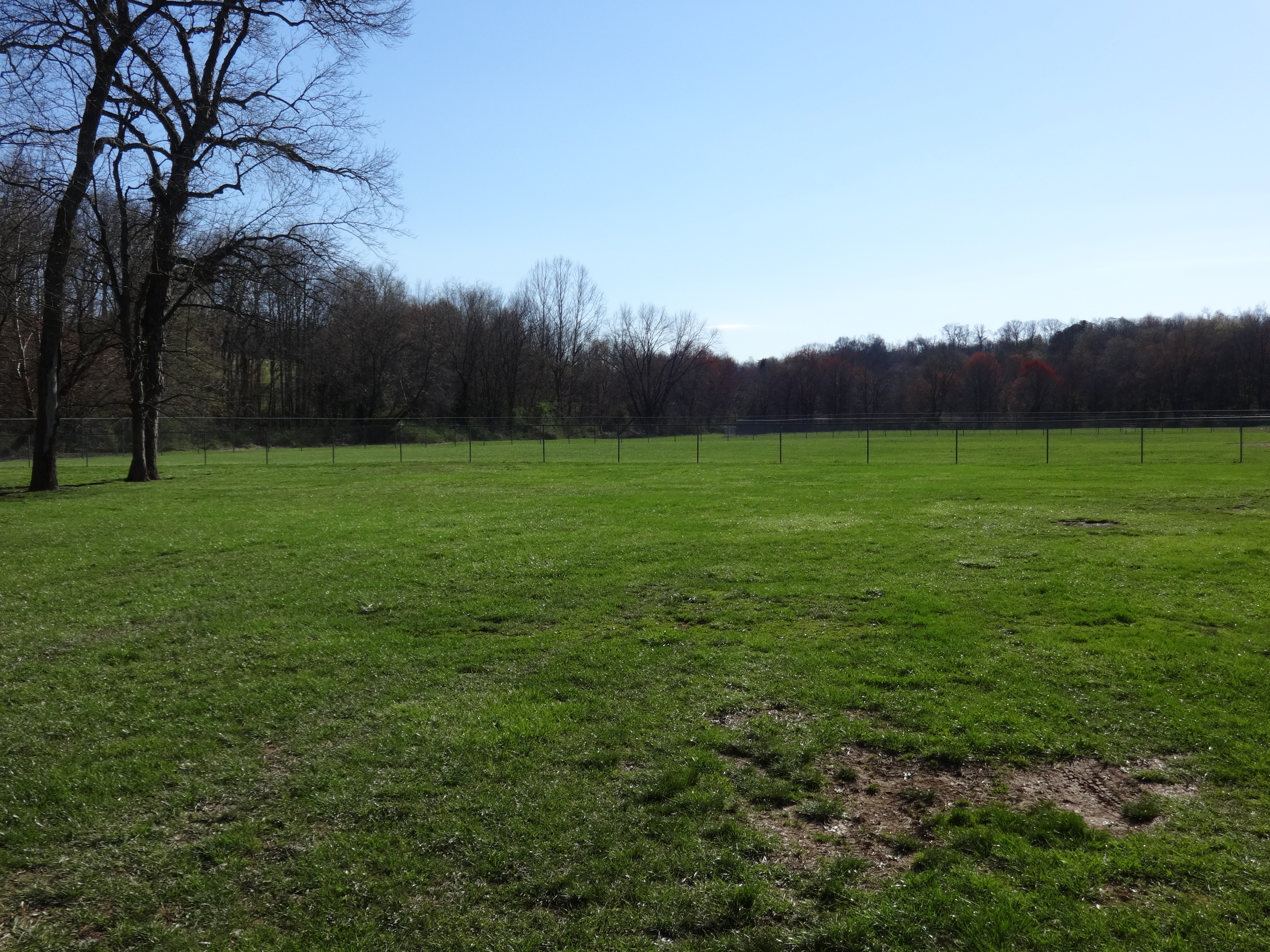
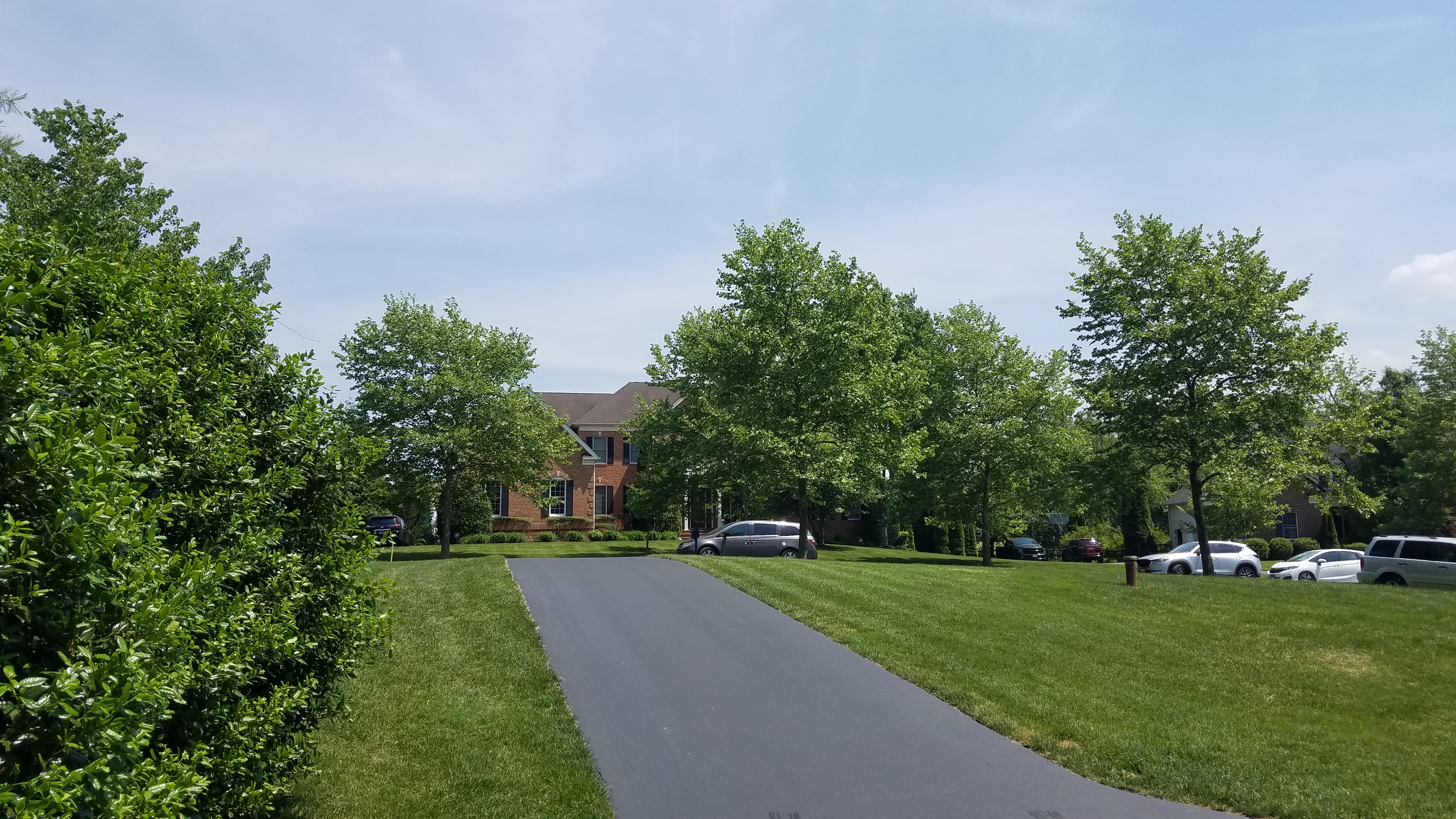
- Woodbine's Salt Box Ball Field and a typical residential neighborhood in Woodbine

- Location within Maryland Location within the United States
- Coordinates: 39°21′39″N 77°3′43″W
- Country: United States
- State: Maryland
- Counties: Howard; Carroll
- Named for: Woodbine Plant

Population (2014)
  - Total: 8,124
- Time zone: UTC-5 (Eastern)
  - Summer (DST): UTC-4 (EDT)
- ZIP code: 21797
- Area code: 410, 443, 667

Woodbine is an unincorporated rural community in Howard and Carroll counties, Maryland, United States. It is part of the Baltimore metropolitan area. It is located southeast of Frederick, west of Baltimore, north of Washington, D.C., and east of Mount Airy. The community was named for the woodbine plant, which grew in the community in fields and along riverbanks.

== Background ==
Woodbine is located at the juncture of the Patapsco River, the B&O Railroad, and the road that runs north from Lisbon to Winfield on Liberty Road (Maryland Route 26) and through to Westminster, Maryland. The original road from Baltimore to Frederick runs just north of Lisbon, following a slight ridge line westward halfway to Woodbine (the road was finally paved in the 1960s). This was the original trail that existed before the National Road was built (the road that runs through Lisbon).

== History ==
During the Civil War, Confederate cavalry crossed the Patapsco River at Woodbine and at Hoods Mill, just a few miles east on the river and the B&O Railroad, scouting a U.S. army that was on its way to the Battle of Gettysburg. The main road at that time ran just west of the existing road and up the west side of a creek that runs south and that joins with the Patapsco River just 50 yards west of the existing road. That original road, now partly unused, runs north 100 yards from the river and then Eastward (Gum Road) to join up with the existing road today. There was no bridge across the Patapsco River at that time, just a ford in the river.

The town straddles the Patapsco River to the north (into Carroll County) and south (into Howard County). A new concrete bridge was constructed between 1916 and 1917. In the 1920s and 1930s the town had a large canning factory on the Carroll County side of the river. There was another small canning factory, from the turn of the century, run by water power west of Woodbine at the foot of New Port Hill. Remains of the factory still exist, and the sluice where water (from Gillis Falls Run) came to run the machinery is still visible in the wooded area below New Port Hill leading north to the dam, no longer existing.

Just north, 300 yards up the hill and west of the existing road (SR 94) on John Pickett Road, was a wormseed distillery, where wormseed oil was steam-distilled. This small factory was later converted into the Woodbine Canning Factory, canning tomatoes, corn, and peas. The factory burned in June 1933 and was converted to a paper mill in the 1950s.

== Notable people ==
- Larry E. Haines, Maryland state senator
- Alex Horwath, soccer player
- Albin Owings Kuhn, first chancellor and chief planner of the UMBC campus
- Albert Levitt, jurist
- Kyle Snyder, Olympic gold medalist freestyle wrestler, three-time NCAA wrestling champion at Ohio State
- Tony Massenburg
- Alyssa Parker, field hockey player
- David H. Berger, General, USMC, 38th Commandant of the United States Marine Corps, (July 11, 2019 – July 10, 2023)
- Scott Foster (basketball), gambler

== See also ==
- Cherry Grove, HO-1
- Gary, Maryland
- Oakdale Manor
- Sunnyside (Woodbine, Maryland)
