= Mary Theresa Wiedefeld =

American educator

- Born: February 2, 1886; Baltimore, Maryland
- Died: November 23, 1983 (aged 97); Howard County, Maryland
- Occupations: State Supervisor of Elementary Schools; Principal of State Teachers College at Towson

Mary Theresa Wiedefeld (February 2, 1886 – November 23, 1983) was the seventh president (formerly principal) of State Teachers College at Towson (now Towson University).

She was raised in Baltimore, and had a sister and a brother, Robert Weede. She graduated from Johns Hopkins University with a Bachelor of Science and a Doctor of Education.

Wiedefeld attended the predecessor to Towson from 1901 to 1904 and served as its seventh president from 1938 to 1947. She had many roles in Maryland public education, including grade-school teacher from 1914 to 1919. Afterwards, she worked in Maryland Department of Education from 1919 to 1938, becoming the State Supervisor of Elementary Schools. Wiedefeld was president during World War II when enrollment declined and employees were hard to obtain. Under her administration, the college developed a special program for cadet teachers to help alleviate the teacher shortage, took the first steps toward preparing teachers for junior high and kindergarten and inaugurated a junior college program in the arts and sciences. She retired in 1947, and died on November 23, 1983.

Preceded by Lida Lee Tall	Towson University president 1938-1947	Succeeded by Earle Hawkins
