= Henry S. West Laboratory School =

Location
- 5300 Carillo Street; Coral Gables, Florida 33146; United States
- Coordinates: 25°43′16.42″N 80°16′26.59″W

Information
- Type: K-8 Center
- Established: 1954; 72 years ago
- School district: Miami-Dade County Public Schools
- Principal: Dr. Michelle Sanchez-Perez
- Faculty: 23.0 (on an FTE basis)
- Grades: K-8
- Enrollment: 357 (2023-24)
- Student to teacher ratio: 15.52
- Colors: Green and Orange
- Mascot: Crab
- Website: westlab.dadeschools.net

Henry S. West Laboratory School is a K-8 school in Coral Gables, Florida, United States, on the University of Miami campus and is part of the Miami-Dade County Public Schools system. As of the 2023-24 school year, it enrolled 357 students and has 23 faculty on a full-time basis for a student-teacher ratio of 15.52, according to National Center for Education Statistics data.

== History ==
The Henry S. West Laboratory School is located on the campus of the University of Miami and is part of Miami-Dade County Public Schools. The school was established in 1954, as an experimental school of choice associated with the School of Education at the University of Miami. It was named after Henry Skinner West. and is known for its collaborations with the university's Department of Teaching and Learning, which lead to the development of innovative projects such as scientific programs and the creation of a living habitat. University faculty members and students teach and conduct research throughout the school under the direction of Dr. Shawn Post, as the "Professor in Residence". The peculiarity of this institute lies in its being an experimental school of choice associated with the university's School of Education. Among the past teachers, Aldeen H. Lindgren stands out, a fifth-grade teacher who was named "Best Teacher of All Time" by the L.B. Clements Educational Foundation.

== Awards ==
West Laboratory School is graded "A", the highest designation on Florida's six-point assessment scale.

Aldeen H. Lindgren, 5th grade teacher, retired, of Palm City Florida, was recently named "All Time Best Teacher Ever" by the L.B. Clements Educational Foundation.

Nicole Jose, 7th and 8th grade science teacher, won Dade County Science Teachers' Association's Science Teacher of the Year 2025 in the middle school category.
