= Cherry Grove (Woodbine, Maryland) =

Historic house in Maryland, United States

- Cherry Grove, HO-1
- U.S. National Register of Historic Places
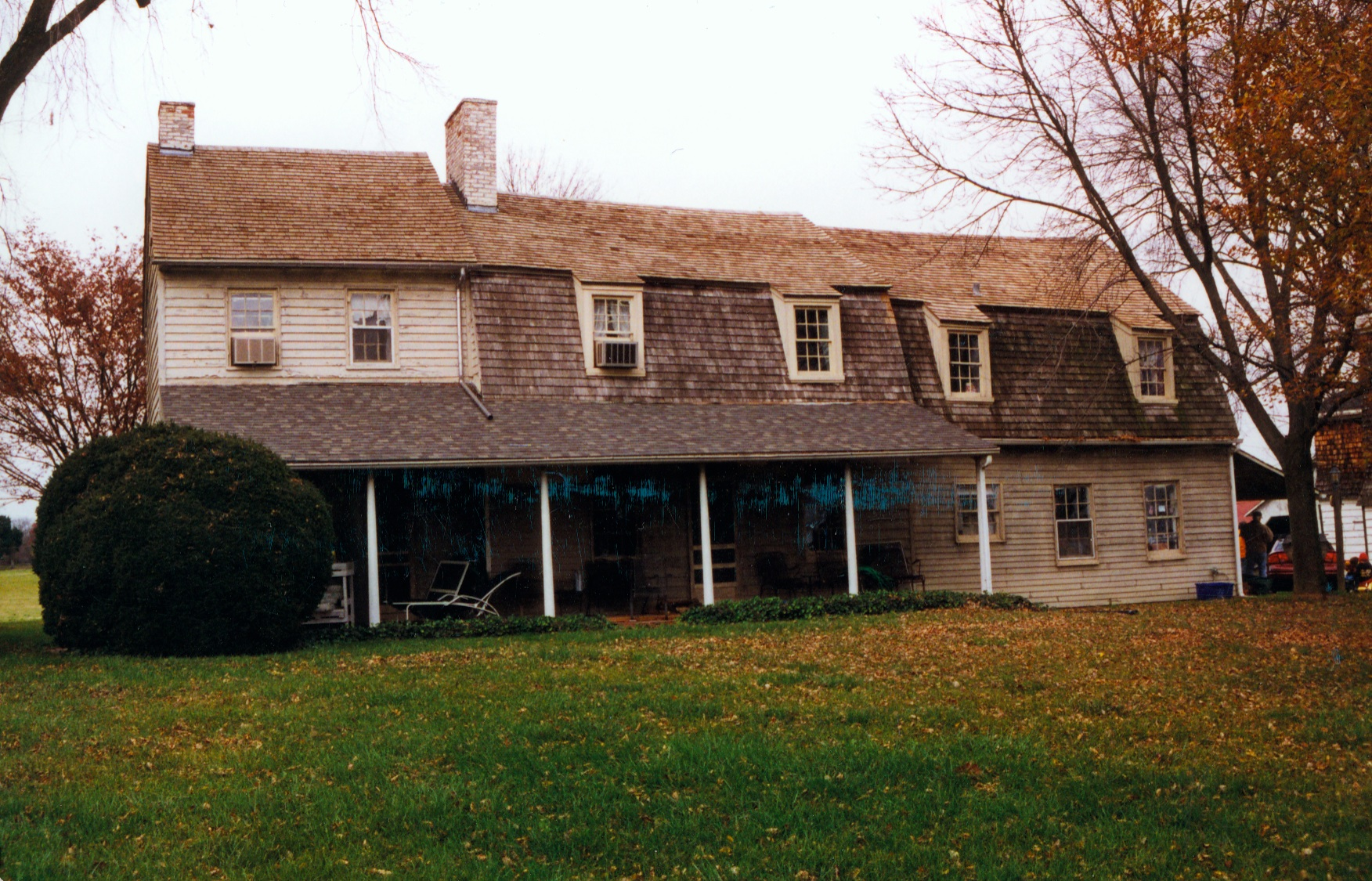

- Location within Maryland Location within the United States
- Location: 2937 Jennings Chapel Road, Woodbine, Maryland
- Coordinates: 39°17′39.3786″N 77°05′37.7262″W
- Area: 12.1 acres (4.9 ha)
- Built: 1798
- NRHP reference No.: 07000567
- Added to NRHP: June 21, 2007

Cherry Grove is a historic home and former forced-labor farm located at Woodbine, Howard County, Maryland, United States. The home is considered the seat of the Warfield family of Maryland.

The multi-part house was built by Captain Benjamin Warfield starting after 1766 after acquiring a 550-acre land grant from Henry Griffith named "Fredericksburg". The complex includes a ca. 1798 log ground barn, an 1860-1890 frame wagon shed with corn crib, an early-20th century frame water tower, frame ground barn with cantilevered forebay, frame shed, frame dairy barn, concrete silo, concrete block dairy, and several frame shelter sheds. The buildings are located on a generally flat site surrounded by gently rolling terrain and are set well back from the road along a gravel drive that winds through the center of the farm. The J.P. Tarenz log house was built around 1768 to house people enslaved by the farm owners; after the Civil War, it was moved offsite to accommodate people freed from slavery. The remains of Maryland's 45th Governor Edwin Warfield (1848–1920), are buried onsite in the family cemetery.

The property was owned by Arthur G. Nichols Jr. and wife in 1976 and was subdivided down to 338 acres.

Cherry Grove was listed on the National Register of Historic Places in 2007.

== See also ==
- List of Howard County properties in the Maryland Historical Trust
- Sunnyside (Woodbine, Maryland)
- Oakdale Manor
