= WYPR =

Public radio station in Baltimore, Maryland

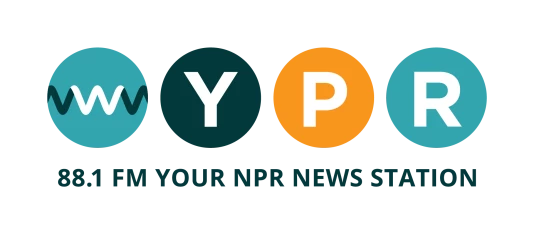

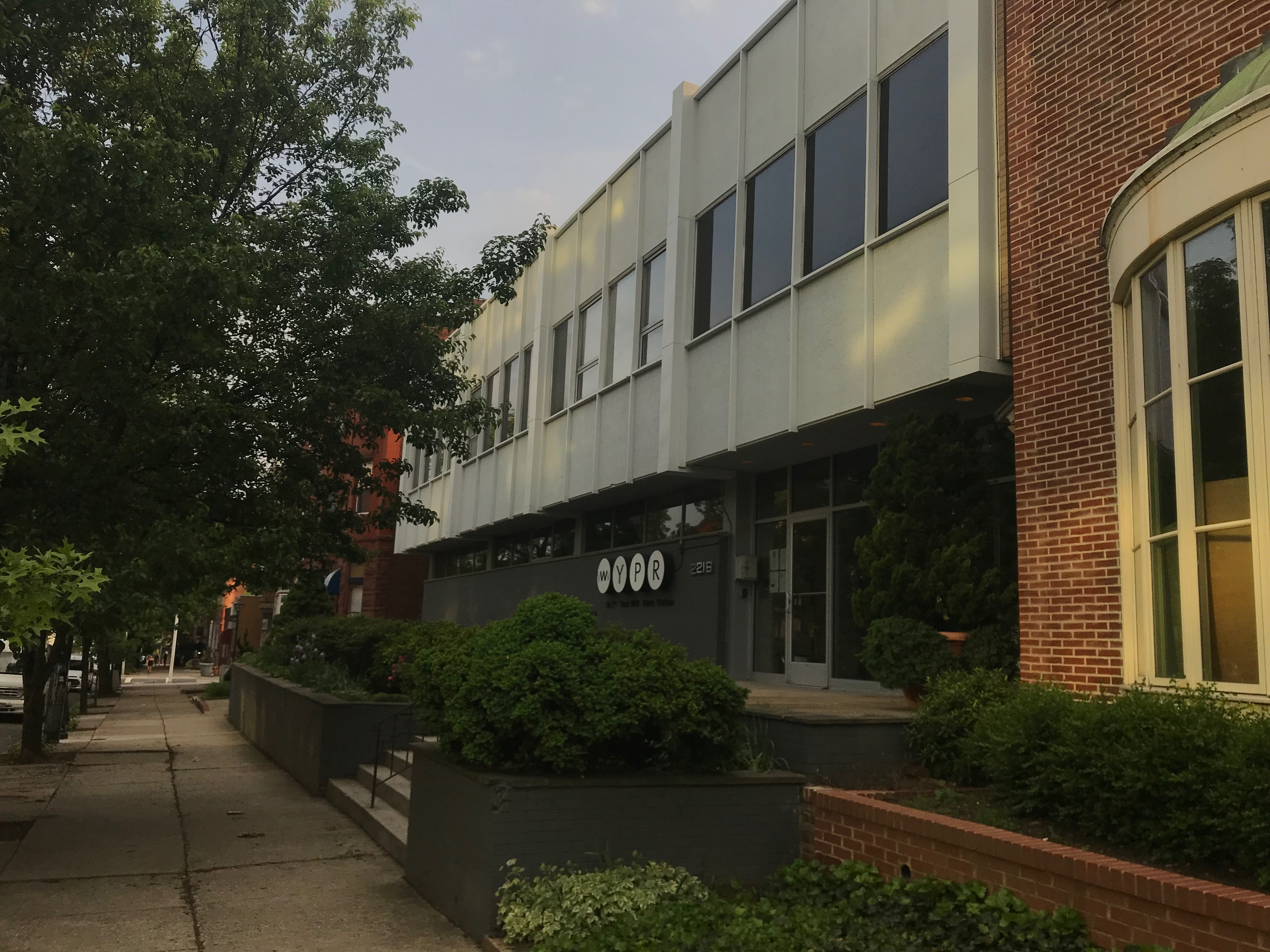
- Studios at former Allegheny Pepsi building
- Baltimore, Maryland; United States
- Broadcast area: Baltimore metropolitan area
- Frequency: 88.1 MHz (HD Radio)
- RDS: WYPR
- Branding: 88.1 WYPR

Programming
- Language: English
- Format: Public radio (News/talk/jazz)
- Subchannels: HD2: BBC World Service; HD3: Classical music
- Affiliations: American Public Media; BBC World Service; NPR; PRX

Ownership
- Owner: Baltimore Public Media; (WYPR License Holding, LLC)
- Sister stations: WTMD

History
- First air date: April 2, 1979
- Former call signs: WJHU (1979–2002)
- Call sign meaning: We're Your Public Radio

Technical information
- Licensing authority: FCC
- Facility ID: 65753
- Class: B1
- ERP: 15,500 watts
- HAAT: 129.6 meters (425 ft)
- Transmitter coordinates: 39°19′53″N 76°39′28″W
- Repeaters: 88.1 WYPF (Frederick); 106.9 WYPO (Ocean City)

Links
- Public license information: Public file; LMS
- Webcast: Listen live; Listen live (via iHeartRadio)
- Website: www.wypr.org

WYPR (88.1 MHz) is a non-commercial public radio station serving the Baltimore metropolitan area. Its studio is located on North Charles Street in the Charles Village neighborhood of northern Baltimore, while its transmitter is located on Violet Avenue in Park Heights. The station is simulcast in the Frederick and Hagerstown area on WYPF (88.1 FM) and in the Ocean City area on WYPO (106.9 FM).

WYPR is Baltimore's flagship National Public Radio member station, carrying content from NPR, American Public Media (the distribution arm of Minnesota Public Radio), Public Radio Exchange and the BBC World Service (on HD2). WYPR also provides Classical 24 on its HD3 subchannel. In addition, WYPR produces several of its own shows, including the public affairs-focused programs Midday and On The Record, the award-winning, sonic-storytelling series Out of the Blocks as well as local news coverage and special newsroom series.

Starting in 2015, the Baltimore Magazine Reader's Poll has named WYPR the Best Radio Station in Baltimore three years in a row. The station also won Best Radio Show Host, and Best News Website in 2017.

== History ==
The station signed on in 1979, as WJHU, a 10-watt student-run station owned by Johns Hopkins University. It took over from a carrier current station that had operated under the same calls on AM 830 since 1945. Originally a typical freeform college radio station, it boosted its power to 25,000 watts in October 1986, allowing it at least secondary coverage of the entire Baltimore/Washington corridor. Soon after the power increase, Johns Hopkins converted the station into a full-time professional operation, allowing it to become Baltimore's NPR member station. It originally aired a mix of classical music and NPR programming, but on June 23, 1995, switched to a primarily news/talk format.

Johns Hopkins put the station up for sale in 2000, due to the expense of maintaining it, as well as a change in focus that no longer included radio. In 2001, Your Public Radio Corp., a community group led by station host Marc Steiner, bought the station and changed its calls to WYPR. The university's budget officer stated it had declined to entertain offers from religious broadcasters, which might have produced a higher sale price, as it preferred to sell to an entity that would continue with news/talk programming.

During its ownership by Johns Hopkins, the station suffered from coverage issues due to its low transmitting antenna, which was located on campus with a height above average terrain of only 49 metres (161 ft). After purchasing the station, Your Public Radio Corp. applied to move its transmitter to Baltimore's famous Television Hill, increasing its height by nearly threefold at the cost of reducing power to the current 15.5 kW.

In 2004, Your Public Radio Corp. bought religious broadcaster WJTM in Frederick, which became a relay of WYPR with the call letters of WYPF. WYPF's signal also covers Hagerstown. On July 30, 2007, Your Public Radio Corp. bought Ocean City, Maryland alternative rock station 106.9 WRXS, which began simulcasting WYPR starting September 10, 2007. That station was renamed WYPO on October 3, 2007. The three stations provide at least distant-grade coverage to almost two-thirds of Maryland.

In May 2021, WYPR announced plans to acquire Towson-based WTMD, an adult album alternative station owned by Towson University. The sale was closed on November 10, 2021, and WTMD retained its existing programming.

In 2024, the stations' parent changed its name to Baltimore Public Media and introduced new sonic identities for both WYPR and WTMD.

=== Repeaters ===
Call sign	Frequency; (MHz)	City of license	ERP; W	Class	FCC	First airdate	Former callsigns
WYPF	88.1	Frederick, Maryland	1,000	B1	FCC (WYPF)	May 1991	WFXM (1984–1986); WJTM (1986–2004)
WYPO	106.9	Ocean City, Maryland	4,500	A	FCC (WYPO)	1994	WLGE (1993); WRXS (1993–2007)

=== Newsroom Series ===
- "On Pills and Needles: Maryland's Opioid Crisis" with Rachel Baye (2017)
- "Eight and Out: Transgender in the Second Grade" with Mary Rose Madden (2017)
- "Chesapeake Bay Collaborative" (2015–17)
- "On The Watch: Fixing the Fractured Relationship Between Baltimore's Police and Its Communities," by Mary Rose Madden (2015–16)
- "Up With Neighborhoods: A Southwest Baltimore Partnership" with Frasier Smith (2015–16)
- "Rockets' Red Glare: the War, the Song, and their Legacies" (2013–14)
- "Deconstructing Vacants" with P. Kenneth Burns (2014)
- "Sparrows Point: The Plan, The Cleanup, and The Promise" with Paul Lee (2015)
- "Common Core: A Work in Progress" with Gwendolyn Glenn (2014)

== Events ==
WYPR is a media sponsor of the local Patterson Park Concert Series throughout the summer months. In addition, the radio station is also a media partner of Stevenson University's Baltimore Speakers Series at the Meyerhoff Symphony Hall in Baltimore.

== Awards ==
- In 2014, WYPR's production The Lines Between Us earned a DuPont-Columbia Award for outstanding journalism, one of the highest awards in American journalism.
- WYPR was honored by the Chesapeake Associated Press in 2016 for a series on pedestrian safety in Ocean City, as well as reporting on the April 2015 rioting in Baltimore, and a commentary entitled "A Shattered City and a Search for Justice".
- Also in 2016, the Chesapeake Associated Press and the Public Radio News Directors, Inc. selected On the Watch, a year-long series by reporter Mary Rose Madden on police reform in Baltimore after the death of Freddie Gray, for an award of excellence.
- WYPR's series Out of the Blocks was honored with a 2016 regional Edward R. Murrow Award for outstanding documentary. Out of the Blocks brings real stories of struggle, survival, and celebration in Baltimore City to listeners in a format that includes an original musical score for each episode by Baker-award-winning composer Wendel Patrick. Out of the Blocks was also named "Best Radio Series" by Baltimore's City Paper in 2016.
- Best of Baltimore Readers' Poll named WYPR "Best Radio Station" in 2017, in addition to naming WYPR's Tom Hall "Best Radio Show Host" (runners up being Nathan Sterner and Sheilah Kast, also of WYPR) and naming wypr.org "Best Website (News)". The radio station was also runner-up for both "Best Instagram Account" and "Best Twitter Account".
