= Gary, Maryland =

Unincorporated community in Maryland, U.S.

Gary is an unincorporated community in Howard County, Maryland, United States. A postal stop operated between February 2, 1892, and June 13, 1918. The town is located at the crossroads of Sharp and Triadelphia Road near modern Woodbine, Maryland.
