= WEAA =

- Baltimore, Maryland; United States
- Frequency: 88.9 MHz (HD Radio)
- Branding: Morgan State University Radio

Programming
- Format: Public radio
- Affiliations: NPR, NFCB

Ownership
- Owner: Morgan State University

History
- First air date: January 10, 1977
- Call sign meaning: "We Educate African Americans"

Technical information
- Licensing authority: FCC
- Facility ID: 43794
- Class: B1
- ERP: 12,500 watts
- HAAT: 67 meters (220 ft)
- Transmitter coordinates: 39.342°N 76.587°W

Links
- Public license information: Public file; LMS
- Website: weaa.org

WEAA (88.9 FM) is a non-profit, NPR affiliate station that serves Baltimore, Maryland. It is licensed and owned by Morgan State University. WEAA is located on campus, with studios on the third floor of the School of Global Journalism and Communication on Perring Parkway, and a transmitter on Hillen Road.

WEAA was named 1999 Jazz Station of the Year by Gavin Magazine.

The station has been noted for its willingness to host intense discussions of issues like racism and sexuality.

Although WEAA is based at Morgan State, most of its staff are non-students, and it serves a larger community within Baltimore. However, the station does take on many student interns and volunteers, who learn skills connected to radio broadcasting.

== History ==
WEAA went live on January 10, 1977. It debuted at 88.9 MHz as an educational, non-commercial station. Its first format was "black progressive," which featured a wide range of music by black performers: jazz, Caribbean, a gospel show, some blues, some soul, and album tracks by black artists. The station also had a news department and broadcast some educational programs. Some sources have claimed that the call letters stood for "We Educate African-Americans." Program manager Al Stewart said his vision was for the station to both educational and entertaining. And because the station was on the campus of Morgan State, students would be given valuable experience gathering news or producing public affairs programs, in addition to serving as deejays. After beginning with 18 hours a day of programming, WEAA tried to move to a 24-hour a day operation in mid-May 1977. However, the station was not able to sustain this, and instead returned to a regular schedule of being on air from 6 AM to midnight, 7 days a week.

Within a few months, WEAA was gaining positive attention for its news coverage: student reporters focused on events of interest to the black community, in addition to events occurring on campus. Members of the news department also began winning awards for their news features. The station also covered college sports, including Morgan State football. WEAA soon proved to be successful at fundraising, getting listeners to support the station's programs. By 1979, the station was able to raise more than $50,000 during a pledge drive, exceeding the station management's expectations. Additionally, WEAA became home to several people who went on to become famous. Among them was Kweisi Mfume, who served as program director of WEAA, beginning in the late 1970s, and also hosted a popular talk show; Mfume subsequently went on to a career in politics. Another famous alum of WEAA was April Ryan, who began working there as a disc jockey and then began hosting a news program in the late 1980s; she went on to become a news reporter for the American Urban Radio Networks, and a political analyst for CNN. Some professional announcers also worked at WEAA, mentoring young students interested in broadcasting: one well-known veteran of black radio in Baltimore, Larry Dean (real name: Lawrence D. Faulkner), helped to start WEAA's news department and worked as the station's news director for nearly eight years.

== Station Controversies ==
In 1998, white Baltimore activist Robert Kaufman accused WEAA of reverse racism when they turned down his offer to host a show for free. Kaufman's complaint with the Maryland Commission on Human Rights was unsuccessful.

In 2007, a coalition of WEAA listeners took to the streets in protest when "The Powers Report" with Tyrone Powers went off the air. Powers and his supporters alleged that newly elected governor Martin O'Malley had used his political clout to force Powers off the air in retaliation for critical remarks. Powers filed a lawsuit alleging that O'Malley ordered him fired, with WEAA manager Donald Lockett and NAACP president Kweisi Mfume acting as intermediaries. O'Malley and Mfume denied the allegations completely.

In 2008, WEAA hired Marc Steiner (after Steiner's dismissal from WYPR) and began running Democracy Now!. These changes increased the ratio of news to music and added white voices, prompting observers to ask, "Will whites listen to a majority black station?" In the following months, WEAA gained 20,000 listeners for a total of 100,000.

== Current programs ==
=== Programs produced in-house at WEAA ===
==== Public Affairs programming ====
- Today with Dr. Kaye hosted by Dr. Kaye Wise Whitehead
- The Marc Steiner Show hosted by Marc Steiner and produced by the Center for Emerging Media
- First Edition with journalist Sean Yoes
- Keep It Moving with Marsha Jews
- Wealthy Radio with Deborah Owens
- Urban Health Beat with Marilyn Harris-Davis
- The Anthony McCarthy Show with Anthony McCarthy
- Listen Up! and Final Call Radio with Farajii Muhammad
- The Caribbean Affair with Neil Mattei
- Africa and Worldbeat
- Briefcase Radio with Omar Muhammad
- The Ellison Report with political analyst Charles D. Ellison
- The Rise of Charm City

==== Music programming ====
- The Baltimore Blend hosted by Baltimore drummer and musician Robert Shahid and co-hosted by Mykel Hunter
- The Hip Hop Chronicles hosted and produced by Mike Nyce with contributions from Dr. Jared Ball and the Chuck D
- In the Groove and Cool Jazz Countdown with Marcellus Bassman Shepard
- The Audio Infusion with DJ Patrick Scientific and DJ Henry Da Man
- Reggae, Roots & Culture with Papa Wabe
- Cool Vibes For Your Midday with Sandi Mallory
- Fiesta Musical with Guillermo Brown
- In the Tradition with George Doc Manning
- Jazz Straight Ahead produced and hosted by John Tegler and currently hosted by his two sons Eric Tegler and Jan Tegler
- Blues in the Night and Turning Back the Hands of Time with host James Big Jim Staton
- The Friday Night Jazz Club with Angela Thorpe and DJ Phaze
- Strictly Hip Hop Baltimore's longest running underground hip-hop show which originated in 1990.
- Gospel Grace

=== Syndicated programs on WEAA ===
- Democracy NOW! with Amy Goodman and Juan Gonzales
- Jazz After Hours with Bob Parlocha
- Latino USA hosted by Maria Hinojosa

== Past programs ==
- The Michael Eric Dyson Show (2010–2012)
- The Powers Report with Tyrone Powers (–2007)
- Underground Experience with Oji Morris and Brian Pope (1989–2002)
- Sisters Circle with Nalonga Sayyed and Faraja Lewis
- Dialogue with the African-American Male with Richard Rowe and Earl El-Amin

== See also ==
- List of jazz radio stations in the United States
- List of community radio stations in the United States
