= Sarah Richmond (university president) =

President of Towson University

Sarah Elizabeth Richmond
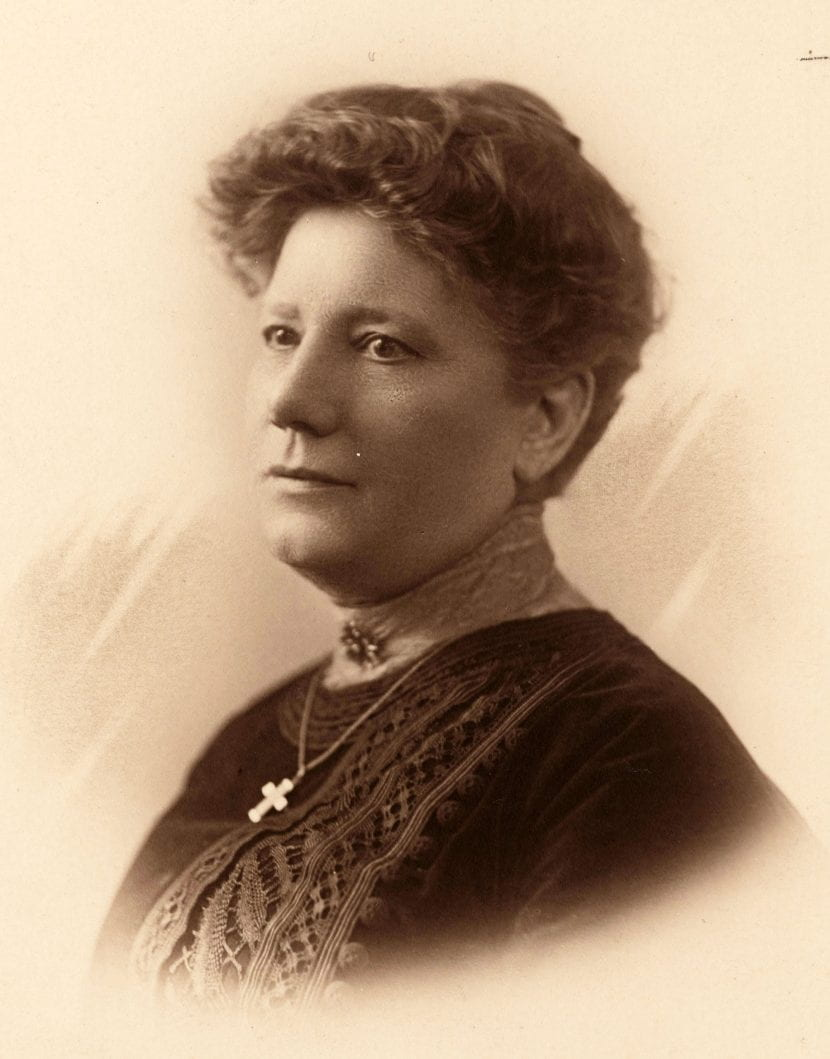
- Born: 1843; Baltimore, Maryland
- Died: March 4, 1921 (aged 77–78)
- Occupations: Vice Principal, Maryland State Normal School; Principal, Maryland State Normal School

Sarah Elizabeth Richmond (1843–1921) was a teacher and the fourth principal of Maryland State Normal School (now Towson University).

She was the second person to enroll at the Maryland State Normal School in its opening year and was in its first graduating class. Her 55 years of consecutive service to the Normal School began in 1866, when McFadden Newell asked her to return there to teach mathematics. Within a few years, Richmond was made Vice Principal and, by 1909, at age 66, she became the school's first female principal. She remained principal until 1917 when she resigned to become Dean of the school. In addition to being the driving force in moving the school to its current Towson location, Richmond raised entrance requirements, expanded the curriculum and created new departments.

She died on March 4, 1921.

Preceded by George W. Ward	Towson University principal 1909-1917	Succeeded by Henry Skinner West
