= James L. Fisher =

American academic and psychologist (1931–2022)

- Born: James Lee Fisher; June 2, 1931; Decatur, Illinois, U.S.
- Died: September 7, 2022 (aged 91); Vero Beach, Florida, U.S.
- Title: President of Towson University

James Lee Fisher (June 2, 1931 – September 7, 2022) was an American academic administrator and psychologist. He served as the ninth president of Towson State University (now Towson University) from 1969 to 1978.

== Early life ==
Fisher was born in Decatur, Illinois, on June 2, 1931. He initially studied at Millikin University but dropped out due to poor academic performance in 1950. He subsequently enlisted in the US Marine Corps and served for four years. After being discharged, he resumed his studies and graduated with honors from Illinois State University in 1956. He was awarded a Doctor of Philosophy in psychology from Northwestern University seven years later.

== Career ==
Fisher was first employed in the administration of Northwestern while he was completing his doctorate there. After six years in that capacity, he became president of Towson State College in 1969, succeeding Earle Hawkins at the age of 38. During his tenure, Fisher instituted a winter academic session and created new positions for five academic deans and four vice presidents. He also oversaw the development of the campus with the construction of thirteen buildings. Student enrollment almost doubled under his leadership from 5,727 to 10,762. The college was eventually renamed Towson State University in 1976. Fisher was dubbed a "master educational politician" by The Baltimore Sun as a result of his success, and he was even urged to run for governor of Maryland by the leaders of the state's Democratic and Republican parties. He ultimately stepped down as university president in 1978, to become president of the Council for Advancement and Support of Education (CASE).

As CASE president, Fisher undertook hundreds of institutional reviews for universities, and consulted with over 300 post-secondary institutions. He also contributed to a daily radio show on WBAL for a few years. He was conferred 12 honorary degrees and wrote or edited 11 books. The outstanding thesis award at Illinois State (his alma mater) is named in his honor, as is CASE's distinguished service to education award.

== Personal life ==
Fisher was married to Barb. He had four children: Kerry, Kathy, Kurt, and John. He initially resided in the Baltimore metropolitan area before relocating to Vero Beach, Florida, during his later years.

Fisher died on September 7, 2022, at his home in Vero Beach. He was 91 years old.
