= XTSR =

Coordinates: 39°23′36″N 76°36′25″W

- Towson, Maryland; United States

Programming
- Format: Adult contemporary

Ownership
- Owner: Towson University

History
- First air date: 1971

XTSR is a college radio station owned by Towson University and managed by the Department of Electronic Media & Film. Their internet radio programming operates 24/7 with a mix of live student DJ shifts and automated programming.

== Operations ==
Popular shows XTSR Features are "Total Talk Sports", "The Pregame", "Wynn to Wynn", "True Crime Tuesdays" and "On God No Cap"

At the station, radio students learn first hand about the basics of running a radio station. The station's genre includes Sports talk, Adult Contemporary, Pop Culture, Live Dj's, Poetry, Comedy, Hip Hop, and Rock. They also have contacts with most major and independent music labels.

XTSR can be streamed through the website (XTSR.org), through iTunes under the College Radio tuner, or through the College Radio tuner app for the iPhone and iPod touch.

Students living on Towson University's campus can listen on channel 26 on the campus' cable television network.
