= Sunnyside (Woodbine, Maryland) =

Bon Air Manor
- Location within Maryland
- 39°17′45.6″N 77°07′27.4″W
- Location: 3258 Woodbine Road Woodbine, Maryland

History
- Built: 1800

Site notes
- Architectural style: Romanesque

Sunnyside or Sunnyside Farms is a historic slave plantation home located in Woodbine, Howard County, Maryland.

Sunnyside began as a log cabin built in 1800 by Capt. Banjamin Warfield of Cherry Grove's son Joshua Warfield. In 1830, Albert Gallatin Warfield expanded the home, and a second expansion was completed in 1890 by his son Joshua Warfield.

Albert Warfield was known for generously freeing his slaves at the age of 40, albeit at a time when life expectancy was shorter. His son Joshua Warfield operated a title company, and imported food waste for composting fertilizer for soil. The house later passed to Norman Hutton Warfield (1889 - 1955) who worked for the Federal Land Trust. The last Warfield heir to own the estate was the assistant states attorney for Howard County, Albert Gassaway Warfield III (-1983) who worked for Pierce, Fenner and Smith Inc. The farm is now known as Timberleigh Farm

== See also ==
- Cherry Grove, HO-1
- List of Howard County properties in the Maryland Historical Trust
