= Mark L. Perkins =

- Born: October 13, 1949; Richmond, Virginia, U.S.
- Occupations: President of InnerSight, Senior Executive and Partner Master Key Consulting

Mark L. Perkins is the president of InnerSight. He served as president of Towson University from July 2001 to April 2002.

== Education ==
Perkins earned a doctorate in psychometrics and statistics from the University of Georgia in 1976. He received his master's in psychometrics and research design from the same institution in 1974. Perkins earned a bachelor's degree from St. Andrews Presbyterian College in 1972.

== Towson University ==
Perkins briefly served a controversial tenure as president of Towson University from July 2001 to April 2002.

He resigned after three members of the University System of Maryland Board of Regents, including the chairman, told him in a meeting that he would be fired if he did not step down, according to a four-page letter he posted on Towson's website.

In the letter, Perkins stated the spending included improvements for coping with handicap accessibility as well as "family health issues" and for making the home a suitable place to entertain prospective donors. The regents were aware these improvements were necessary prior to selecting Perkins.

The university received approval from the regents to buy a six-bedroom mansion in northern Baltimore for $850,000. The university subsequently spent $860,000 on renovations, but $360,000 more had been allocated to complete renovations and provide furnishings for the public spaces of the university home as well. Perkins claimed Towson officials were unaware of flaws in the home when the university bought it. Workers subsequently found deteriorating wall coverings, unabated lead paint and asbestos.

Perkins said in his letter that he was not involved in many of the spending decisions on the home, including $279,000 for an elevator and $25,000 for a multimedia system. However, Perkins wrote, he took "full responsibility" for controversies including the spending on those renovations, which dominated discussions with the Board of Regents ahead of his resignation.

There was also an inauguration ceremony held using funds raised specifically for the event, which reportedly cost $56,000. In his letter, Perkins said he had agreed to the event because "it was designed to celebrate not me or my arrival, but instead, the 135 years of commitment to learning on the Towson campus."

The Baltimore Sun reported that similar concerns about excessive spending by Perkins were raised at the University of Wisconsin–Green Bay, where he was president before coming to Towson. Perkins had pushed for $630,000 in improvements to the president's house on that campus to make it acceptable for parties, but he rarely entertained guests of the university in the house, The Sun reported.

Perkins also sparked controversy when the university spent $25,000 on a university medal symbolizing the president's office. All funds used for the inauguration and the medallion were raised for those purposes by a committee charged with organizing the inaugural events.

Preceded by Hoke L. Smith	Towson University president July, 2001–April, 2002	Succeeded by Robert L. Caret
