= McFadden Newell =

McFadden Alexander Newell
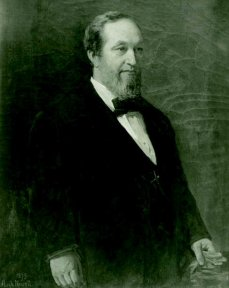
- Born: 1824; Dublin, Ireland
- Died: 1894
- Occupation(s): Principal, Maryland State Normal School; Maryland State Superintendent of Public Instruction

McFadden Alexander Newell (1824–1894) commissioned and was the first principal of Maryland State Normal School (now Towson University).

Newell was an Irish immigrant who graduated from Trinity College, Dublin. He also taught school in England before settling in Baltimore, Maryland in 1848. He was a professor of natural science at the Baltimore City College, from 1850 to 1854. In 1865, Newell was asked to establish a state normal school and served as its principal from 1866 to 1890. During this time, he also served as State Superintendent of Public Instruction.

As Principal at MSNS, he improved both teacher education and public school instruction, set admissions standards for the Normal School and refined the school's curriculum.

Preceded by	Towson University principal 1866–1890	Succeeded by Elijah Barrett Prettyman
