= Lida Lee Tall =

President of Towson University

- Born: 1873; Fishing Creek, Dorchester Co., Maryland
- Died: 1942 (aged 68–69)
- Occupations: Principal, State Teachers College at Towson

Lida Lee Tall (1873–1942) was the sixth principal/president of State Teachers College at Towson (now Towson University).

== Early life and education ==
Tall was born on November 17, 1873, in Fishing Creek, Maryland, to Sarah E. and Washington Tall and educated in Baltimore's public schools, Tall earned her bachelor's degree at Columbia University and her doctorate at the University of Maryland.

== Career ==
Tall guided the institution through its major transition into a four-year college. In 1935, the Maryland State Normal School changed its name to the Maryland State Teachers College and implemented a four-year course leading to a bachelor of science degree. Under Tall's leadership, the college continued to expand and improve its programs, receiving national recognition for the quality of its programs and faculty. Of special interest to Tall was attracting good students to Towson and enriching their lives. She was active in the development of social and educational events and programs, promoted student government and numerous clubs and established the first honor society.

In 1942, the on-campus elementary school was named in her honor. The building was reconstructed decades later. It was razed in 2006 to make way for the College of Liberal Arts building.
