= List of Eastern Michigan University buildings =

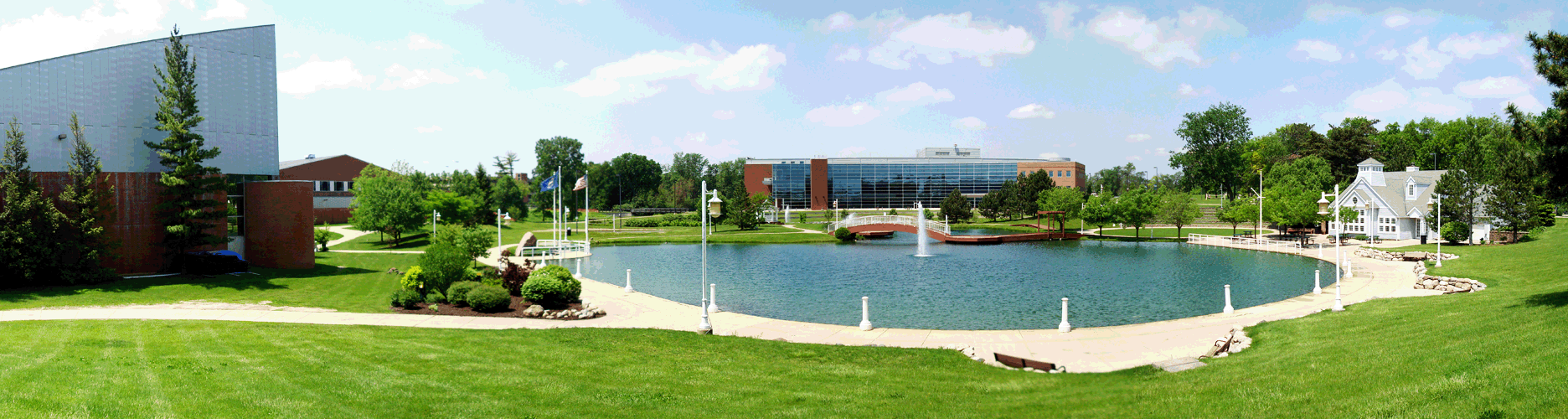
University Park on campus, in the background is the Rec/IM, Student Center and Lakehouse.

The following is a list of buildings at Eastern Michigan University in Ypsilanti, Michigan. EMU is home to many notable structures, including three high-rise residence halls and the multi-building Eastern Michigan University Historic District on the National Register of Historic Places. Today EMU is composed of more than 122 buildings across 800 acres (3.2 km^{2}) of its academic and athletic campus.

The oldest remaining buildings on campus are Starkweather Hall and Welch Hall; the tallest buildings on campus are Hoyt, Hill, and Pittman Halls (collectively known as the Towers).

== Campus ==
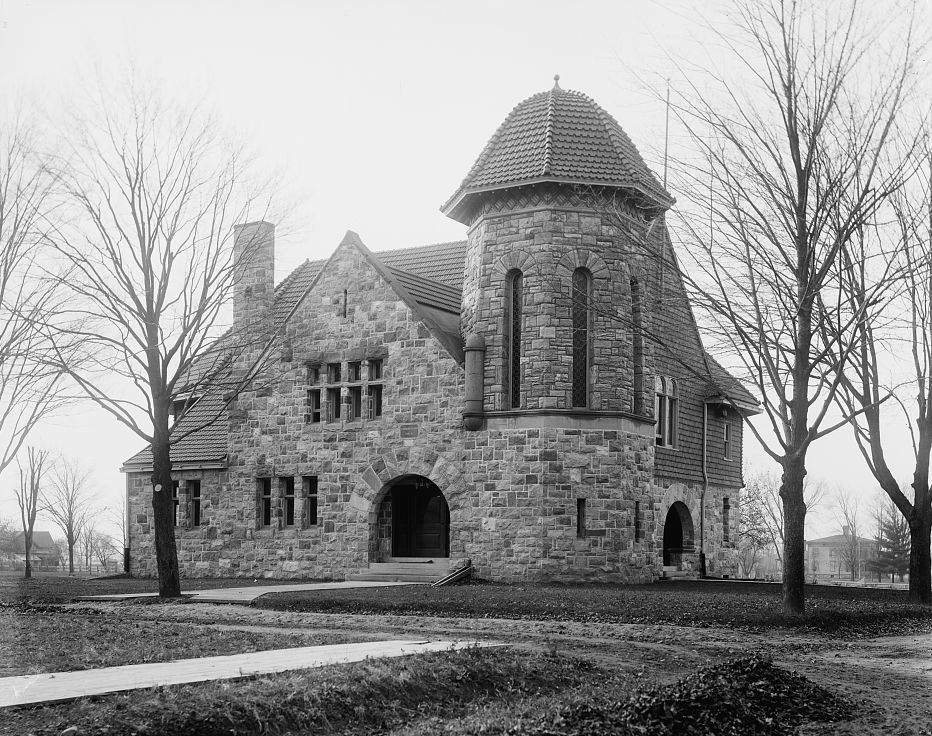
Starkweather Hall, sometime between 1900 and 1909.

EMU is located in Ypsilanti, a city 35 miles (56 km) west of Detroit and eight miles (13 km) east of Ann Arbor. The university was founded in 1849 and started as Michigan State Normal School. In 1899, it became the Michigan State Normal College when it created the first four-year curriculum for a normal college in the nation. None of the original buildings from the Michigan State Normal School have survived, as many of the buildings were wood frame and did not age well. In 1914, Pease Auditorium was built making it the campus' first auditorium. By 1939, residence halls were established allowing students to live on campus. With the addition of departments and the large educational enrollment after WWII, the school became Eastern Michigan College in 1956. The large enrollment boosted the number of buildings and residence halls on campus. Between 1900 and the 1950s, around 20 buildings were constructed on the present-day campus.

Today, the university is composed of an academic and athletic campus spread across 800 acres (3.2 km^{2}), with 122 buildings. The EMU campus includes several buildings with sculpture by Corrado Parducci. The oldest remaining building on campus is Starkweather Hall, which opened in 1896, three days before Welch Hall. The Ypsilanti Water Tower, built in 1889, while not strictly speaking part of the campus, does border EMU on two sides; the north side of the water tower faces Welch Hall across Cross Street, while the east side of the tower faces a campus parking lot (formerly the site of the EMU gymnasium) across Summit Street. Hoyt, Hill, and Pittman Halls, are the tallest buildings in Ypsilanti by floor count; only the Ypsilanti Water Tower, standing 147 feet tall on the highest ground in Ypsilanti, stands taller.

=== Historic buildings ===
Eastern Michigan University's Historic District, comprising Welch, Starkweather, McKenny and Sherzer Halls, is on the National Register of Historic Places The district was established in 1984.

Pease Auditorium is listed on the National Register of Historic Places independently from the Historic District, receiving the designation in 1984.

== Academic buildings ==
Many of EMU's colleges are housed in specific buildings. EMU's newest academic building is the Everett L. Marshall Building, EMU's first "green" building on campus. The building features extensive use of natural lighting and stair treads, furnishings, and furniture made of recycled materials. Flooring throughout the building is made from recycled and renewable resources. Other significant buildings include Pray-Harrold; when built in 1969, it was one of the largest classroom buildings in the United States.

Image	Building	Architect	Style	Completed	Last Major Renovation	Current usage	Namesake	Notes	Ref.
	Everett L. Marshall Building	Landberg Associates, Inc.	Modern	1999		Academic (College of Health & Human Services)	Everett L. Marshall, Dean of Records and Teacher Certification	Built on site of former Goodison Hall	
	Ford Hall (1967–present), Library (1929–1962), Mark Jefferson Library (1952–1967)	Lansing architects Bowd & Munson	Colonial Revival Architecture	1929	1982	Academic (School of Art & Design); art gallery	Richard Ford, Head of Modern Language Department from 1903 to 1940		
	Mark Jefferson Science Complex	Einhorn, Yaffee Prescott	Brutalist	1967	2010	Academic	Mark Jefferson, Geography Department head 1901-39.		
	Pease Auditorium	Smith Hinchman & Grylls	Neoclassical	1914	1990s	Performance hall	Frederic H. Pease, professor of music from 1858–1909 and Head of Conservatory at MSNS		
	John W. Porter Building (1997–Present) The Library (1967-1997)	Swanson Associates	Brutalist	1967	1998	Academic (College of Education)	John W. Porter, university president from 1979 to 1988		
	Pray-Harrold Building	Swanson and Associates	Brutalist	1969	2011	Academic (College of Arts & Sciences)	Carl Esek Pray, Head of the Logical Science and History Department from 1914 to 1938, and Charles F. Harrold, Professor of English Literature from 1925 to 1943.		
	Quirk Dramatic Arts Building & Sponberg Theater	Smith Hinchman & Grylls	International/Modern	1959	1984	Quirk Theatre, 411-seat theatre; Sponberg Theatre, 202-seat theatre; Academic (School of Communication, Media, & Theatre Arts)	Daniel L. Quirk Jr., local philanthropist, and Harold Sponberg, President from 1965 to 1974	Daniel L. Quirk Jr. was from a prominent Ypsilanti family; he founded The Ypsilanti Players, Inc. in 1933 and his daughter, Nancy Quirk Williams, was First Lady of Michigan, 1949 to 1961. New classroom and office space was added in 1967, and the building was last renovated in 1984 to expand the scene and costume shops, and enclose the Amphitheatre, which was renamed the Sponberg Theater. Harold Sponberg was President of Eastern from 1965 to 1974.	
	Roosevelt Hall (1973–Present) Roosevelt High School (1924-1969)	Smith Hinchman & Grylls	Colonial Revival & Neoclassical	1924	1973	Academic (College of Technology)	US President Theodore Roosevelt		
	Sherzer Hall & Observatory	E. W.. Arnold	Late Nineteenth Century Eclectic, Georgian Revival and Victorian Romanesque	1903	1973 and 1989	Academic;astronomical observatory	Dr. William H. Sherzer, professor of geology and head of Department of Natural Sciences from 1892 to 1932		
	Sill Hall	Swanson and Associates	International style	1965	2021	Academic (College of Technology)	John Mayhelm Barry Sill, President from 1886 to 1893		
	Strong Hall			1957	2019	Academic		Connected to Mark Jefferson Building as part of Science Complex	
	Geddes Town Hall School House	Unknown	Vernacular	1895	1987	Academic (College of Education)		One-room school originally located at Morgan and Thomas roads in Pittsfield Township, used as a school until 1957. Moved to campus in 1987.	

== Administrative and student life buildings ==
EMU has several administrative buildings that also serve as student life locations. Bruce T. Halle Library houses one of the largest collections of children's literature in the United States. The building has as an automated retrieval system (the ARC) capable of housing 1 million items. While the most-used books are still on shelves, the majority of the school's books are stored within this system, which runs several stories underneath the library itself. Other buildings of historical significance include McKenny Union, Pierce Hall, Starkweather Hall, and Welch Hall. McKenny was the first student union on the campus of a teachers' college when it opened in 1931. Pierce Hall was dedicated as part of the centennial celebrations of the Normal College in 1949. The residents of Ypsilanti donated the money to construct the 120-foot tower; in June 1950, the school installed the Alumni Memorial Chimes, which were donated by the alumni and dedicated to those who died in World War II. Starkweather Hall is the oldest building still standing on EMU's campus, and Welch Hall is the second oldest building on campus. In parts of Starkweather, the original doorknobs remain, bearing the initials "SCA" for the Student Christian Association, for whom the building was originally constructed. Starkweather Hall was placed on the National Register of Historic Places in 1977.

Image	Building	Architect	Style	Completed	Last Major Renovation	Current usage	Namesake	Ref.
	Boone Hall (1968–present) Administration Building (1914–1950); The Arts Building (1950–1962) Ford Hall (1962–1968)	Smith Hinchman & Grylls	Renaissance Revival	1914	1990s	Administrative	Richard Gause Boone, President of Michigan State Normal College (1893-1899)	
	Bruce T. Halle Library	Giffels, Hoyem, and Basso, Incorporated	Modern	1997		Library	Bruce Halle, MSNC alumni and founder and chairman of the board of Discount Tire	
	McKenny Hall (2009–Present) McKenny Union (1931-2008)	Frank Eurich Jr	collegiate gothic & art deco	1931	1963, 1993, 2008	Administrative; student life	MSNC President Charles McKenny (1912-1933)	
	Pierce Hall	R.S. Gerganoff	Late Modern / Late International with PWA Modern detailing	1948	1989	Administrative	John D. Pierce, the first State Superintendent of Instruction from 1836 to 1841	
	Public Safety Building (formerly the Hoyt Conference Center)	K. F. Leinninger Associates	International	1969	2010	Police Department (EMU DPS)		
	Student Center	Burt Hill Kosar Rittelmann Associates	Post Modern	2006		Student activity center		
	Starkweather Hall	Malcomson and Higginbotham	Richardsonian Romanesque	1895	1961, 1976, 1990	EMU Honors College	Mary Ann Newberry Starkweather, local philanthropist	
	Welch Hall (1960s-Present); Training School (1896-1960s)	Malcomson and Higginbotham	Georgian Revival	1896	1988	Administrative offices; President's office	Adonijah S. Welch, first President of Normal Training School	

=== Dining ===
Eastern has two food courts, an all-you-care-to-eat cafeteria, a marketplace, seven cafes, and three convenience stores. The larger dining facilities on campus are geographically located near residence halls.

Image	Building	Completed	Last Major Renovation	Dining Style	Former name(s)	Ref.
The Commons dining hall at Eastern Michigan University in Ypsilanti, Michigan.	The Commons	1960s	2011	Buffet service style	Dining Commons 1 (DC1)	
	Eastern Eateries	1960	1990s and 2018	À la carte	Dining Commons 2 (DC2)	
	CrossRoads MarketPlace	1969	2008	À la carte, Convenience Store	Dining Commons 3 (DC3)	
	Student Center Food Court	2006		Restaurants: Build Pizza, The Hasty Rabbit, Lobby Shop (convenience store), Smashburger, Sono, Starbucks		
	Eagle Cafe at McKenny Hall			À la carte, Convenience Store		
	Eagle Cafe at Pray-Harrold			À la carte, Convenience Store		
	Eagle Cafe at Alexander Music Building			À la carte, Convenience Store		
	Eagle Cafe at the College of Business			À la carte, Convenience Store		
	Eagle Cafe at Halle Library			À la carte, Convenience Store		
	Eagle Cafe at Mark Jefferson			À la carte, Convenience Store		
	Eagle Cafe at Marshall Building			À la carte, Convenience Store		

== Athletic and recreation buildings ==
EMU has several athletic and recreation facilities used for various sporting events and entertainment events. The EMU Convocation Center hosts convocation, graduation, and concerts. In 2008, Bruce Springsteen performed at Oestrike Stadium in support of Barack Obama during his presidential campaign. "Big Bob's"Lake House hosts yearly events in University Park.

Image	Building	Designer	Completed	Last Major Renovation	Current usage	Seating	Namesake	Ref.
	George Gervin GameAbove Center	Rossetti Associates / The Argos Group	December 9, 1998		Arena, women's basketball men's basketball	8,824 Seats	George Gervin, basketball hall of famer who played for EMU, 1970–1972	
	Bowen Field House	Giffels and Vallet	1955	2010	Arena for track and field wrestling gymnastics	5,400 Seats	Wilbur Pardon Bowen, mathematics instructor and first head of the Department of Physical Education, 1894-1928	
	Eagle Crest Golf Club	Karl Litten	1989	1997	Golf course, hotel			
	Multi-Purpose Air-Supported Indoor Facility (Indoor Practice Facility)	BEI Associates, Inc.	2009		Youth soccer, little league baseball, high school football teams, EMU club sports and recreational groups and Six intercollegiate sports (football, baseball, softball, women's soccer and men's and women's golf)			
	Big Bob's Lake House	M.C. Smith & Associates Architectural Group	1993		Meeting Space, Walking Path, Pond, Sand volleyball courts, ice skating, Relay For Life	800 seat amphitheater	Long-time former Rec/IM Director Bob England.	
	Olds-Robb Rec/IM	Ralph Calder and Associates,	1982	1991	Indoor track, weight rooms, whirlpool, Jones Natatorium		Lloyd W. Olds 1916 alumni, Physical Education professor, EMU’s track team coach 1921-42	
	Oestrike Stadium		1971	2007	Baseball Stadium, Softball Stadium,	2,500 seats	Ronald E. "Oak" Oestrike, former Baseball Coach from 1965 to 87	
	Olds-Marshall- Parks Track		2025		Track field		Lloyd W. Olds, Everett L. Marshall, and Bob Parks	
	Rynearson Stadium		1969	1994	Football field	30,200 Seats	Elton J. Rynearson Sr., football coach for 26 seasons	
	Scicluna Field			2005	Women's soccer, youth soccer	700 seats	Paul Scicluna, first women's soccer head coach	

== Residence halls and apartments ==
EMU has 12 on-campus residence halls, four on-campus apartment complexes, and two university-owned houses. Many residence halls were built after World War II and named after influential professors and EMU presidents.

Image	Building	Architect	Completed	Last major renovation	Current usage	Namesake	Ref.
	600 West Forest (former president's house)	R. S. Gerganoff	1949	1975	House		
	601 West Forest (Brinkerhoff-Becker House)	Unknown	1863–1869	2010	Apartment complex	George M. Brinkerhoff	
	Best Hall	Swanson Associates	1960s	2013	Residence hall	Martha Best, a professor of Biology and Bacteriology from 1924 to 1952.	
	Buell Hall	Swanson Associates	1958	1990s	Residence hall	Bertha G. Buell Professor of History, English Lit, and Political Science from 1899 to 1937	
	Cornell Courts	Swanson Associates	1961 and 1966	2000s	Apartment complex	Located on Cornell Street	
	Downing Hall	Swanson Associates	1957	1990s	Residence hall	Estelle Downing, professor of English from 1898 to 1938	
	Hill Hall	K. F. Leinninger Associates	1969	2009	Residence hall	Susan B. Hill, Dean of Women from 1939 to 1962 and Dean of Students from 1962 to 1969	
	Hoyt Hall	K. F. Leinninger Associates	1969	2012	Residence hall	Charles Oliver Hoyt, Professor of Pedagogy and Head of Education Department from 1896 to 1928	
	King Hall	R.S. Gerganoff	1939	1971	Office space	Julia Anne King, Dean of Women from 1881–1886 and Head of History and Social Science Department from 1886-1913.	
	Phelps Hall	R.S. Gerganoff	1968	2011	Residence hall	Jessie Phelps, Professor in the Natural Sciences	
	Pittman Hall	K. F. Leinninger Associates	1969	2011	Residence hall	Marvin Summers Pittman, the “father of Lincoln Consolidated School” (a local school district), Director of Rural Education at Normal and an EMU faculty member from 1921-34.	
	Putnam Hall	R.S. Gerganoff	1968	2011	Residence hall	EMU President Daniel Putnam 1880; 1881–1883; and 1885-1886	
	Sellers Hall	R.S. Gerganoff	1968	2011	Residence hall	John A. Sellers, Department Head of Chemistry from 1958 to 1964	
	The Village (formerly Oakwood Village Apartments)	Post Modern Residential	2001		Apartment-style residence hall		
	Walton Hall	R.S. Gerganoff	1968	2011	Residence hall	Genevieve Walton, University Librarian from 1892 to 1932	
	Westview Apartments		1967 and 1969	2000s	Apartment complex	Located on Westview Street	
	Wise Hall	Swanson Associates	1968	2017	Residence hall	Margaret E. Wise, a first grade teacher-trainer 1893 to 1939 and Director of Placement from 1927 to 1939	

== Former buildings ==
Nine buildings that were once part of EMU's campus no longer stand. These buildings include the Old Main Building, The Conservatory, an unnamed wooden gymnasium, The Old Gymnasium, the Old Post Mansion, the Business and Finance Building and Goodison Hall, both designed by R.S. Gerganoff, and Pine Grove Terrace Apartments. Goodison was among the first residence halls built on Eastern Michigan’s campus.

The finance building went by various names such as the Health Center (from being built to 1961), the Frederick Alexander Music Building (1961–1984), and informally "Old Alex" after 1980. In 2005, Pine Grove Apartments were demolished to make room for the Student Center.

Image	Building	Architect	Completed	Demolished	Usage	Location	Ref.
	Goodison Hall	R.S. Gerganoff	1939	1998	Residence Hall	Goodison was demolished to build Marshall Hall	
	Alexander Hall	R.S. Gerganoff	1939		Health Center, Music building		
	Brown Hall	R.S. Gerganoff	1949	2024	Residence Hall	Demolished to make green space, following construction of new residence halls.	
	Jones Hall	R.S. Gerganoff	1948	2024	Residence Hall	Demolished to make green space, following construction of new residence halls.	
	Goddard Hall	R.S. Gerganoff	1955	2024	Residence Hall	Demolished to make green space, following construction of new residence halls.	
	Old Gymnasium		1896	1965	Gymnasium	Old Gymnasium stood in the block bounded by Cross Street, Summit Street, Ellis Street (now Washtenaw Avenue), and Normal Street, near the Ypsilanti Water Tower and Welch and Boone Halls on the EMU campus	
	Old Main Building		1852, burned down 1859, rebuilt 1860		classrooms, library, and administration functions	The south wing stood near the present location of Boone Hall, the north wing was near the present location of Pierce Hall, and the rear addition reached the location of Ford Hall.	
	Gary M. Owen College of Business	Dow, Howell and Gillmore Associates	1988	Sold in 2022	Academic (College of Business)	Building was purchased and renovated by private developer. Building had been named for Gary M. Owen, former Michigan Speaker of the House.	
	Munson Hall	R.S. Gerganoff	1941	2024	Residence Hall	Demolished to make green space, following construction of new residence halls.	
	Pine Grove Terrace	Swanson Associates	1955 & 1957	2005	Apartment complex	Where the EMU Student Center stands today	
