= Highland Cemetery =

- U.S. National Register of Historic Places
- U.S. Historic district
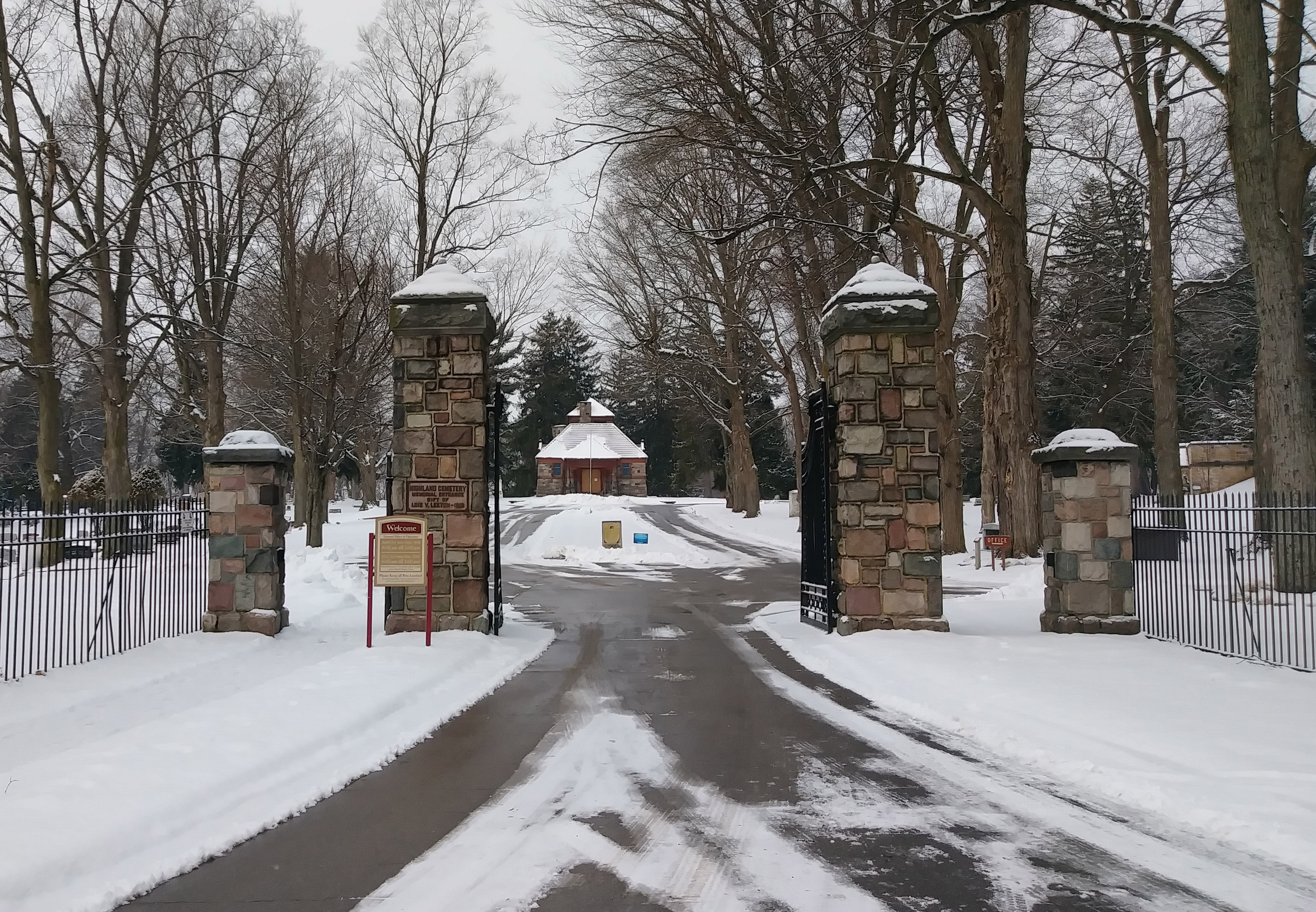
- Cemetery entrance

- Location within Michigan Location within the United States
- Interactive map
- Location: 943 North River St., Ypsilanti, Michigan
- Coordinates: 42°15′26″N 83°36′37″W
- Area: 50 acres (20 ha) (landmarked area)
- Built: 1864
- Built by: Batterson, Canfield & Co., Ames Manufacturing Company, Smith Granite Company
- Architect: Col. James Lewis Glenn, Ray E. Bassett, Julius Hess, Mason and Rice, Donaldson and Meier, Herman and Simons
- Architectural style: Stick/Eastlake, Romanesque Revival, Late Gothic Revival, Classical Revival, Rustic
- NRHP reference No.: 100005026
- Added to NRHP: March 4, 2020

Highland Cemetery in Ypsilanti, Michigan is a 100-acre (40 ha) cemetery founded in 1864. It was designed by Col. James Lewis Glenn in 1863. The cemetery was listed on the National Register of Historic Places in 2020.

== History ==
Ypsilanti had earlier cemeteries, established in the first half of the 19th century. However, by 1850 the city was expanding eastward, and in 1858 Mayor Chauncey Joslin proposed that the city purchase the plot that subsequently became Highland Cemetery. However, this move failed, likely over objections to using tax money to purchase the land. However, in 1863, a group of citizens formed the Highland Cemetery Association for the purpose of establishing a cemetery. They hired James L. Glenn to draw up a plan, and in 1864 purchased the land and dedicated Highland Cemetery. By 1880, nearly 550 burial plots had been spoken for. In 1880, the ornamental gate was constructed in the front of the cemetery, and in 1888 a Richardsonian Romanesque chapel was built in the center of the cemetery.

In 1901, additional property to the south was added to the cemetery. A short time later the entrance lodge was moved, and fieldstone piers added. A mausoleum was built in 1925. Further portions of the cemetery were platted as needed, and Highland Cemetery remains the primary burial place for the city of Ypsilanti. It is still operated by the Highland Cemetery Association.

== Description ==
Highland Cemetery covers about 80 acres, with a rolling, sloped topography which includes knolls, valleys, and ravines. The cemetery is located in a wooded area of oak, pine, cedar and willow trees. As designed by Glenn, the cemetery features curved paths through stands of trees. The entrance to the cemetery is located at 943 N. River St. The gates at the cemetery entrance are constructed of decorative wrought iron and measure 10 feet (3.0 m) high and 81 inches (2.1 m) wide.

A number of structures dating from 1880-1925 are included on the grounds. The cemetery is the site of the Starkweather Memorial Chapel which was commissioned by Mary Ann Starkweather to honor her husband. The chapel, an example of Richardsonian Romanesque style, was designed by George D. Mason and completed in 1889. The cemetery also includes two Civil War memorials. One, known as the Ypsilanti Civil War Memorial, features an inscription stating it was donated by Mary Ann Starkweather. The other, the Ypsilanti Black Civil War Monument, honors the contributions of United States Colored Troops (USCT). Around 40 graves within the cemetery are believed to belong to Black Civil War veterans.

The Highland Cemetery Association, a non-profit cemetery company founded in 1863, owns and operates the cemetery. In 2009, the cemetery began sponsoring an ice cream social after the annual Ypsilanti Memorial Day parade which terminates at the cemetery.

== Notable persons interred at Highland ==
- Edward P. Allen, US Congressman and Civil War veteran
- Owen Cleary, Michigan Secretary of State and president of Cleary College
- P. Roger Cleary, founder of Cleary College
- Byron M. Cutcheon, Civil War brevet brigadier general and Medal of Honor recipient and Congressman from Michigan to the U.S. House of Representatives
- Justus McKinstry, disgraced Civil War major (brigadier general appointment expired without confirmation), suspended November 13, 1861, dismissed from service for corruption, January 28, 1863
- Edwin F. Uhl, Mayor of Grand Rapids, Michigan, Ambassador to Germany and United States Assistant Secretary of State
- Charles Kettles, United States Army lieutenant colonel and a Medal of Honor recipient.

== Gallery ==
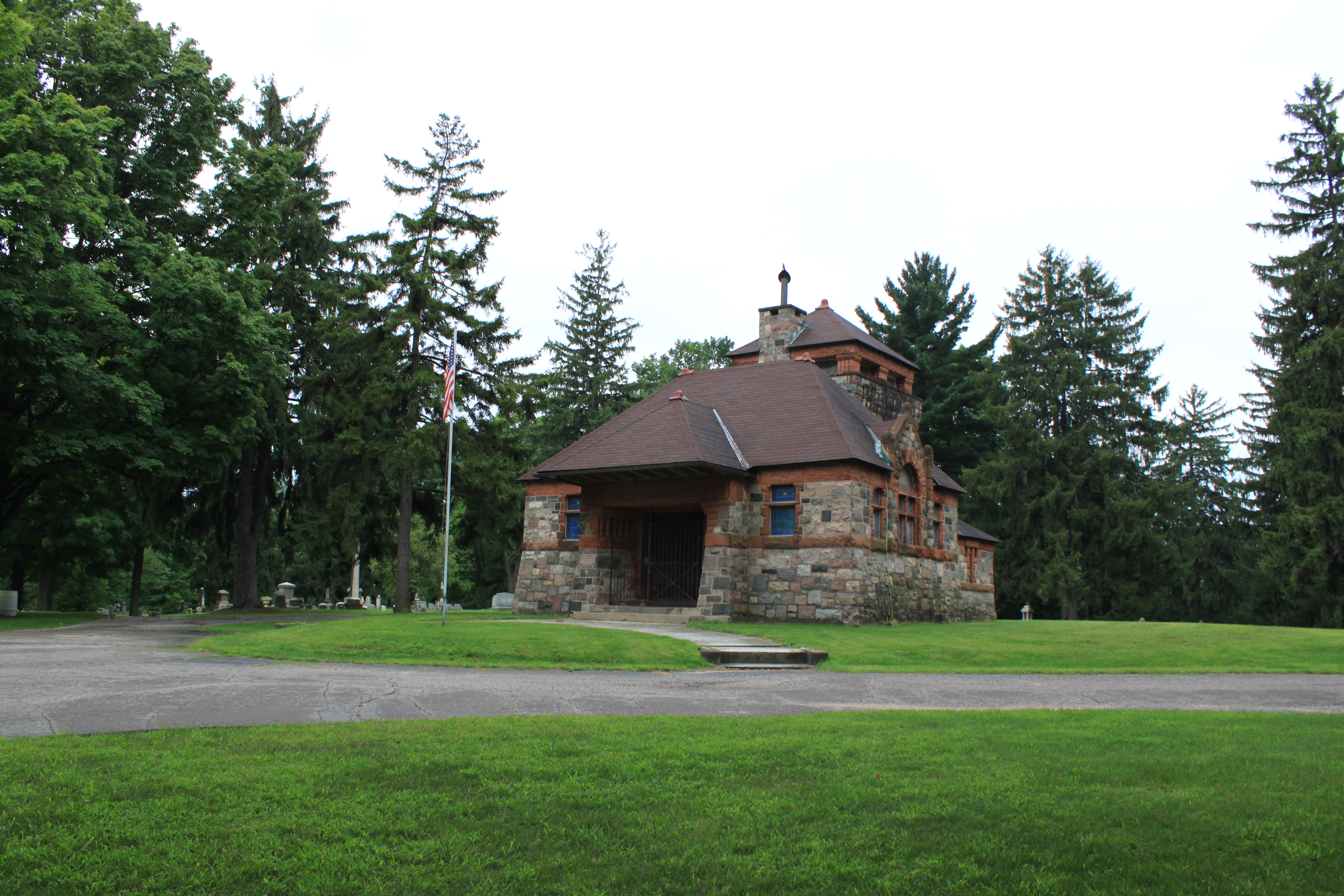
Starkweather Memorial Chapel

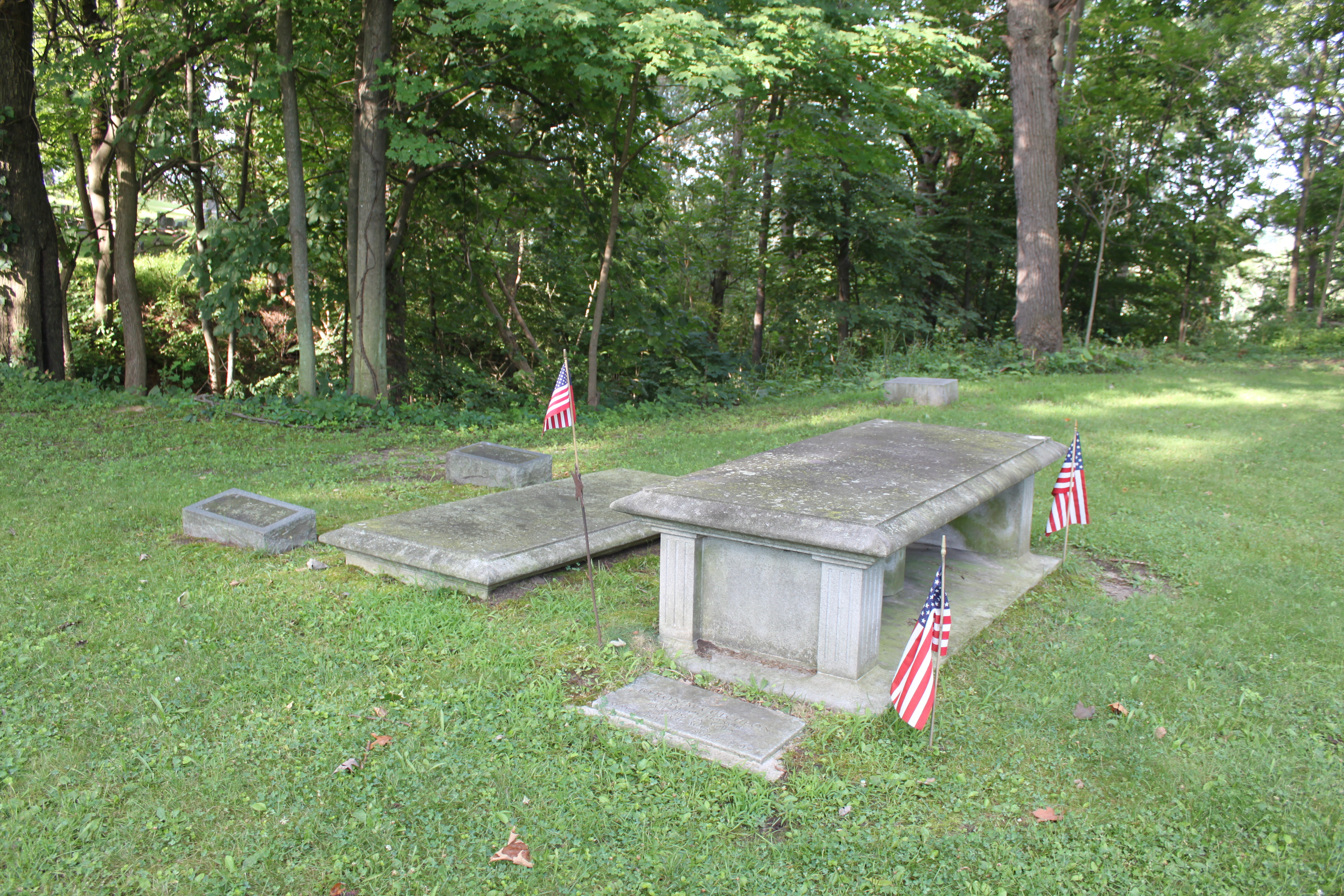
Cutcheon family gravesite

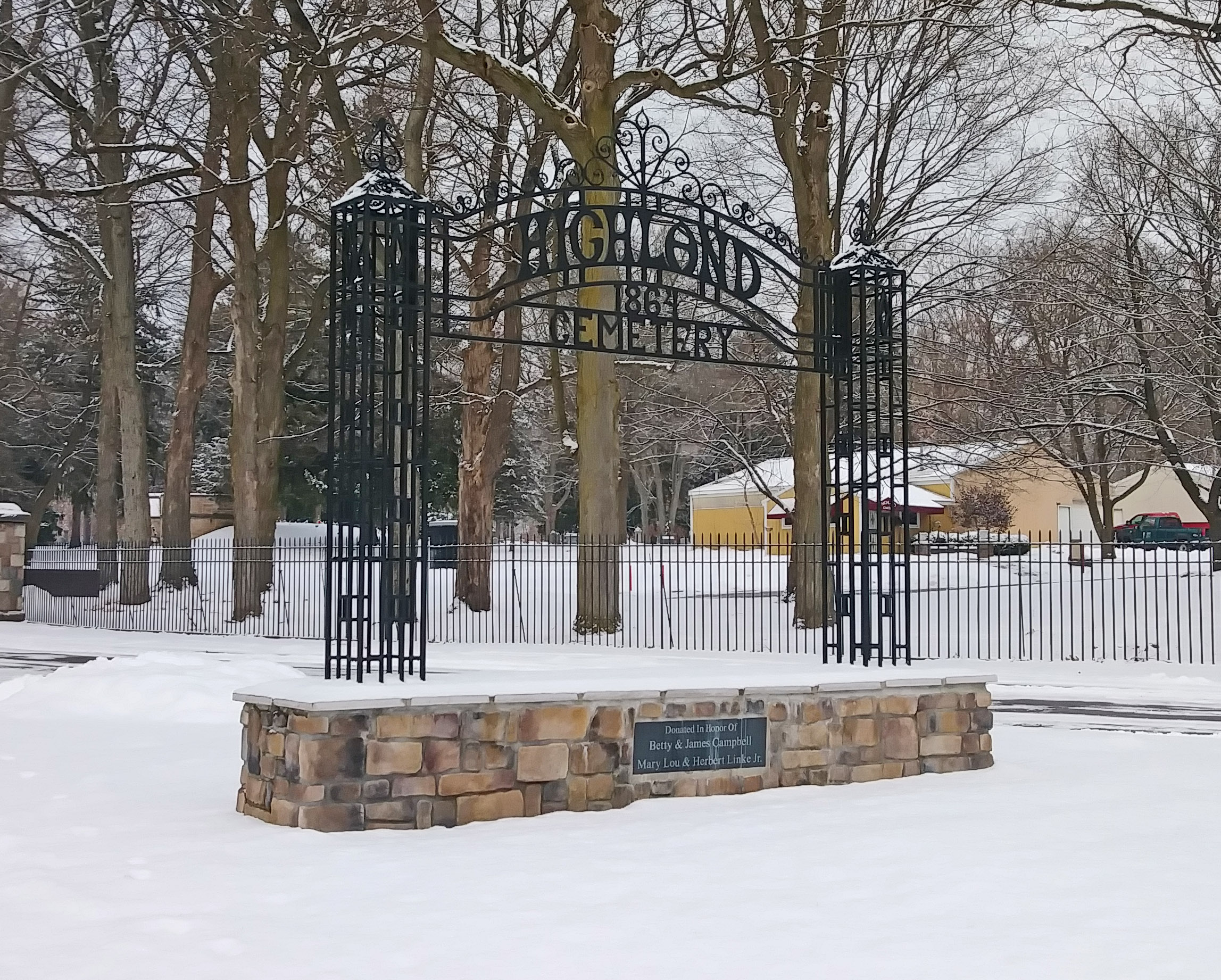

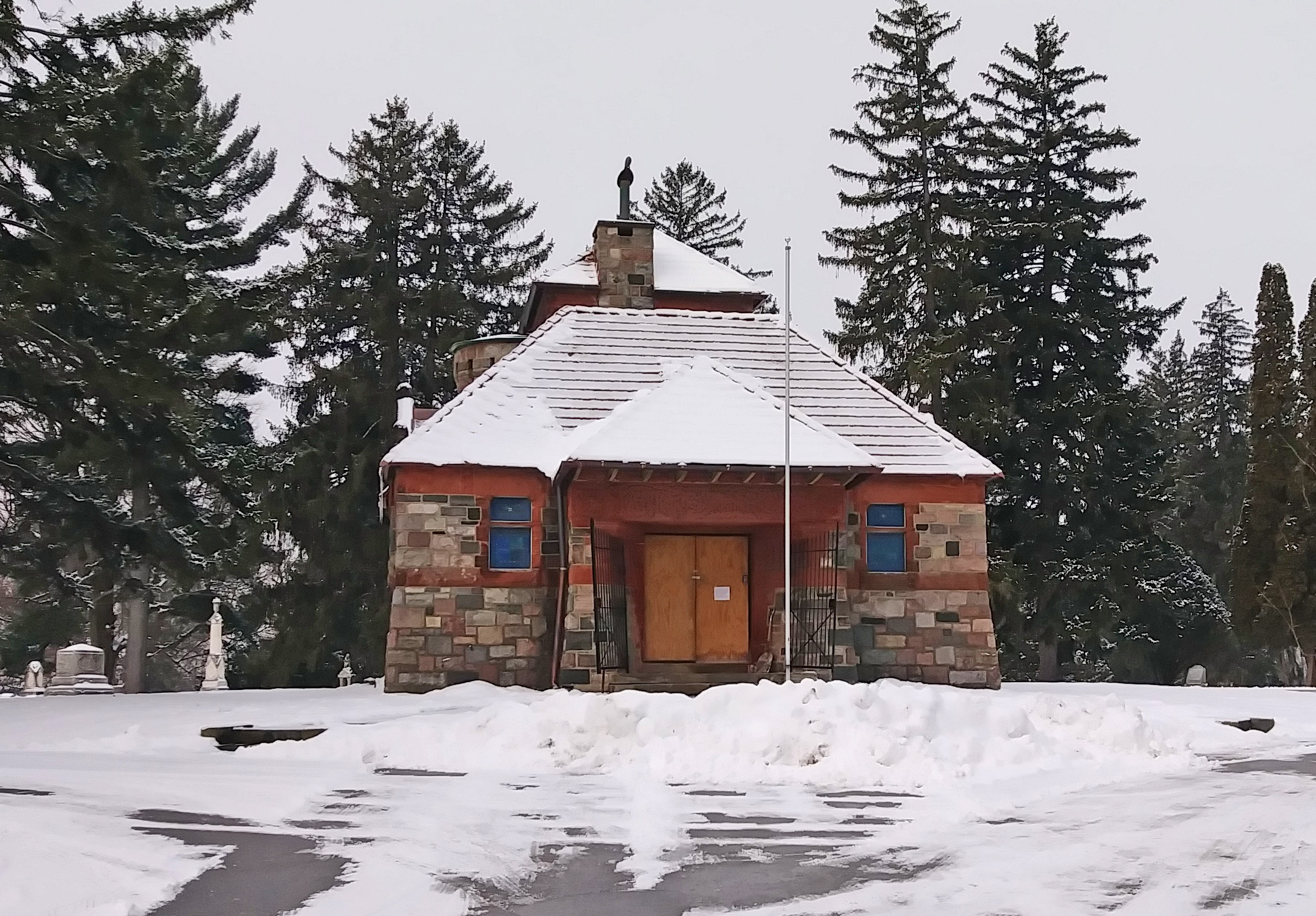

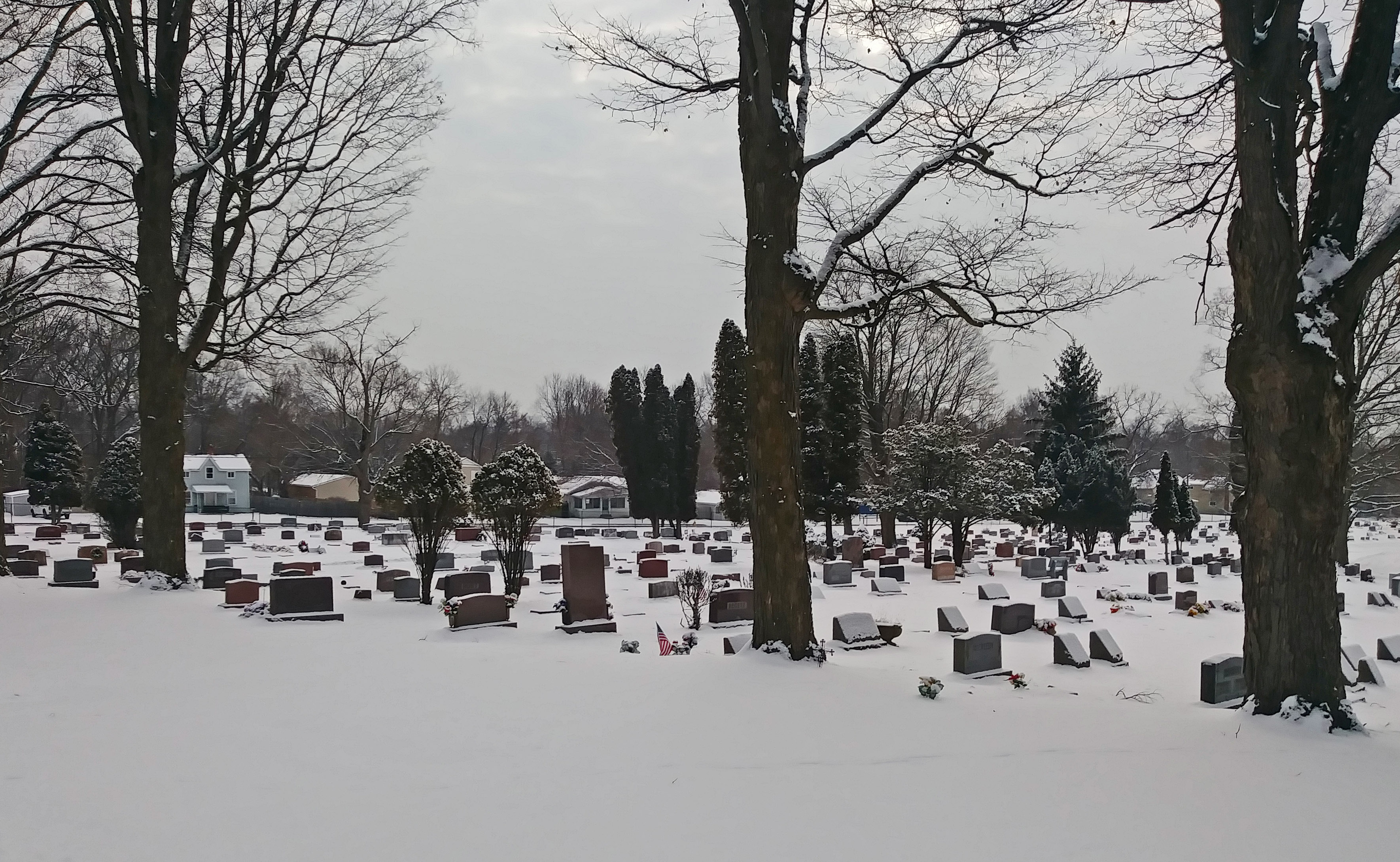
