= Ralph Gerganoff =

American architect

Ralph Stephens Gerganoff (19 January 1887 – 25 November 1966), born Rashko Stoyanov Gerganov and also frequently referred to as R.S. Gerganoff, was an American architect.

Gerganoff was born in Kereka, a village in Dryanovo Municipality, in Gabrovo Province, in northern central Bulgaria on 19 January 1887 and emigrated to the United States via Boston, Massachusetts on 14 Oct 1905. He graduated from high school at Fredonia State Normal College, Fredonia, New York in 1913 and moved to Michigan shortly thereafter where he studied architecture at the University of Michigan, one of nine architecture graduates in 1917.

== Career ==
Gerganoff worked for several years in Detroit, became a naturalized U.S. citizen on 22 January 1920, then in 1927 opened an office in Ypsilanti, Michigan. In time he was to erect many buildings in Ypsilanti, and nearby Ann Arbor.

From the late 1920s through the 1950s, Gerganoff was to become the unofficial architect of the city of Ypsilanti and its surrounding townships, designing virtually all the public schools, fire stations, the hospital, and other public buildings, as well as Cleary College, the Washtenaw Country Club, numerous churches, business, factories, union halls, and the Salvation Army headquarters in Ypsilanti. He also designed many private dwellings, ranging from small Cape Cod cottages to large Eclectic and Tudor styled mansions, and apartment buildings.

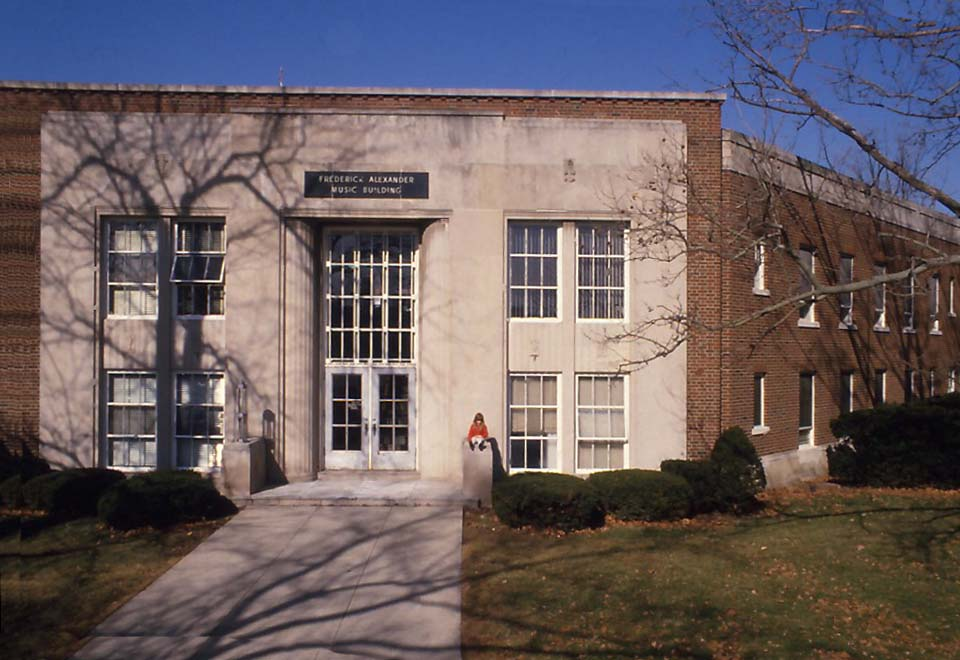
Alexander Hall

For the Michigan State Normal College (later Eastern Michigan University) located in Ypsilanti, he designed the President's Home, at least six resident halls, the Frederick Alexander Music Building, the 1938 football stadium, laboratory and greenhouse, the Administration Building, the Rackham School for Handicapped Children as well as a Service and a Shop building. Some of these structures have since been razed.

He was responsible for designing around two dozen service stations in the Ann Arbor and Ypsilanti areas, after heavy use many of them have been demolished and replaced.

In Ann Arbor, he designed several landmark buildings including the Wolverine Building, the Greek Orthodox Church and the Kingsley Apartments.

Early in his career Gerganoff developed what could be termed a Low Style Art Deco vocabulary. He frequently employs the stepped pyramid shape of Art Deco as well as the rounded corners of the Moderne. He continued designing in the manner well into the 1950s. Following the end of World War II Gerganoff managed to bring his two nephews Steven and Zach Gerganoff to America from Bulgaria and see them trained as architects. Both were to become part of his architectural practice and probably were responsible for his International Style designs of the 1950s and 60s.

At times Gerganoff employed Detroit architectural sculptor Corrado Parducci to create sculpture for his buildings.

R.S. Gerganoff suffered a heart attack while working in the same office that he had worked in since 1927, and died two hours later, on 25 November 1966. He is buried in Highland Cemetery in Ypsilanti.

== Selected commissions ==
- Huron Hotel Washington & Pearl streets Ypsilanti, c. 1924
- Wolverine Building, Washington & Forth streets Ann Arbor, c. 1926
- Materials Unlimited, East Michigan Avenue, Ypsilanti, 1926
- Washington Apartments Washington Street & Washtenaw Avenue Ypsilanti, c.1928
- Kingsley Apartments, East Kingsley Street, Ann Arbor, 1929
- St. Nicholas Greek Orthodox Church, 414 N Main Street, Ann Arbor, 1935 (abandoned by 2011)
- Rawsonville Elementary School, Rawsonville, Michigan, c.1938
- Salvation Army Citadel, East Michigan Avenue, Ypsilanti, c. 1940
- Davis Motors, E. Michigan Avenue, Ypsilanti, c. 1940
- Beyer Hospital, Ypsilanti, 1942
- Kiddie Korner, South Main and Madison, Ann Arbor, c. 1947
- George School, Ypsilanti, c.1950
- Ypsilanti Township Center, Ecorse Road, Ypsilanti Township, c. 1950
- Washtenaw County Court House, Huron and Main streets, Ann Arbor, 1954
- Gillespie Service Station and Sporting Goods Store, West Michigan Avenue and Carpenter Road, Ypsilanti Township, Michigan c. 1955, (destroyed)
- St. Clement Ohridski Macedonian-Bulgarian Orthodox Church, Dearborn, Michigan, c. 1966
- Residence Halls, Eastern Michigan University, Ypsilanti

Gerganoff designed his first residence quadrangle at Michigan State Normal School (now EMU) in 1939 as part of a WPA funded project. The school was later to reuse his designs for additional buildings, thus considerably reducing his commission for them.

King Hall, 1939
Goodison Hall, 1939
Munson Hall, 1940
Jones Hall, 1948
Brown Hall, 1949
Goddard Hall, 1955

- Other EMU buildings

Football stadium, 1938 (destroyed)
Pierce Hall, EMU, Ypsilanti, Michigan 1954
Alexander Music Hall, EMU, Ypsilanti, 1939 (destroyed)
Rackham School of Special Education, EMU, Ypsilanti, 1938
Hover Laboratory EMU, Ypsilanti, 1941 and Greenhouse in 1942
University President's House, Forest Avenue, 1949
