= McKenny Hall =

- U.S. Historic district – Contributing property
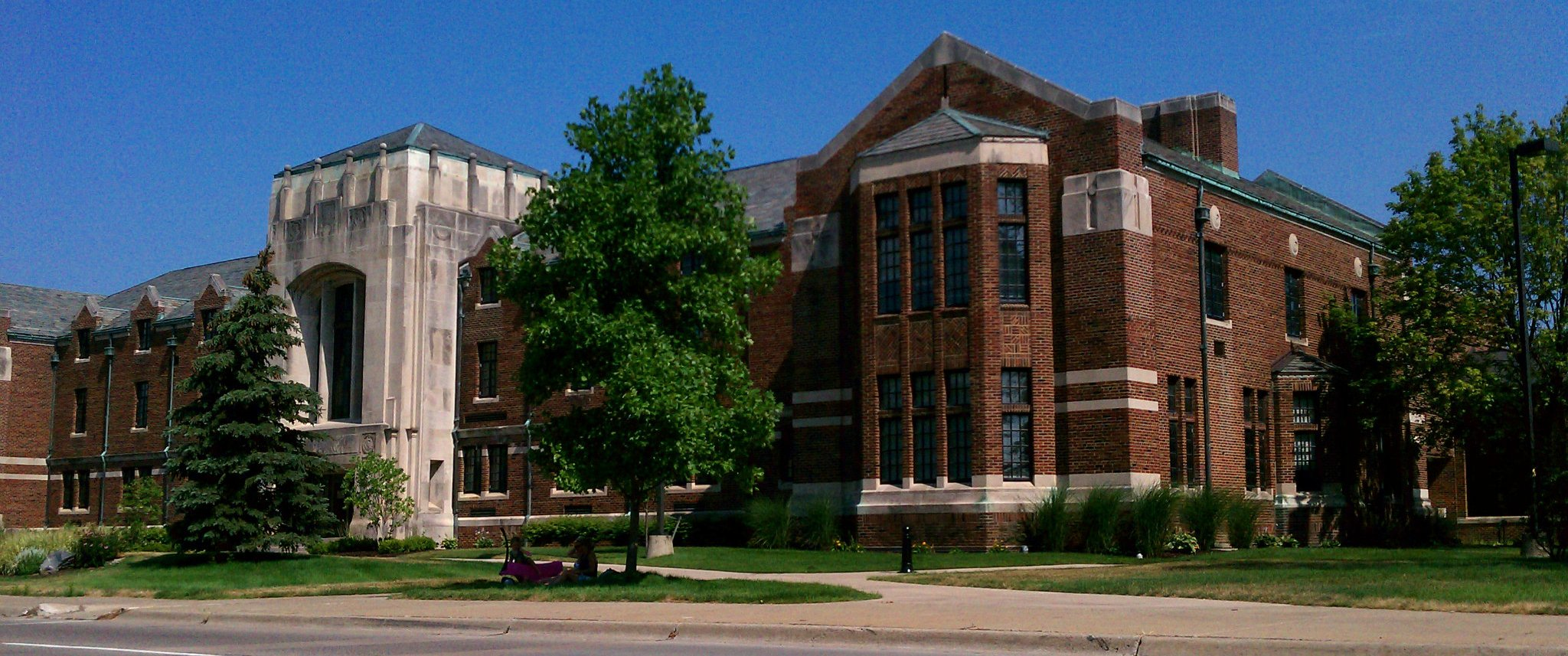
- McKenny Hall
- Location: Ypsilanti, Michigan
- Area: Eastern Michigan University campus
- Built: 1931
- Architect: Frank Eurich, Jr.
- Architectural style: Collegiate Gothic
- Part of: Eastern Michigan University Historic District (PID24948)
- NRHP reference No.: P24948
- Added to NRHP: 1984

McKenny Hall, previously called McKenny Union and Charles McKenny Union, was the first student union on the campus of the Michigan State Normal College (now Eastern Michigan University) in Ypsilanti, Michigan. It now is the home of Chick-fil-A. At various times the building has included bookstores, a bowling alley, a bank, a food court, a ballroom, and other social spaces for students. Today the building is known as McKenny Hall and is home to human resources, academic advising, and career services. After the new Eastern Michigan University Student Center opened in 2006, McKenny closed for renovations and structural preservation work. The building is located across from the famous Ypsilanti Water Tower on Cross Street and is a contributing property to the Eastern Michigan University Historic District.

== History ==
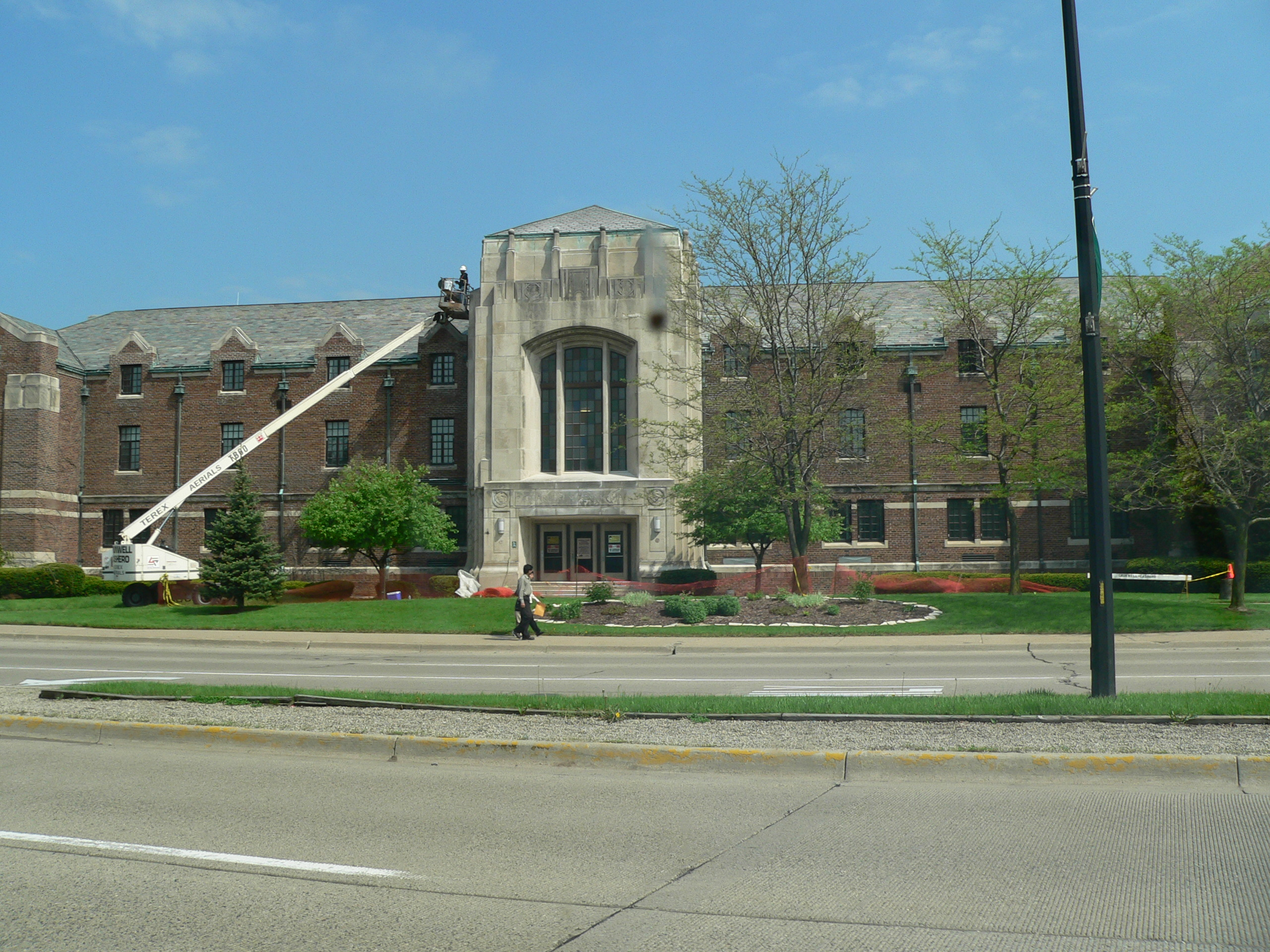
McKenny Union during the 2006–2007 remodeling

Designed by Detroit architect Frank Eurich Jr. in an Art Deco style, construction of the McKenny Union began on November 8, 1930. Named for Charles McKenny, who served as the president of the Michigan State Normal College from 1912 to 1933, the building was dedicated on October 24, 1931 and was the first student union on the campus of a normal college.

President McKenny originally proposed the idea for a student union in 1924 and by 1928 the school had pledges totaling $350,000. However, due to the 1929 stock market crash and the Great Depression, only $130,000 was actually collected by 1930. This lack of funds lead to a change in the building's design. In 1937, the State of Michigan took control of bond repayment, drawing funds from student fees.

In 1963, an expansion by the architectural firm of Jickling & Lyman of Birmingham, Michigan began and the enlarged union, now featuring a bookstore in the basement and a bowling alley. The building was rededicated on April 30, 1966. From 1992 to early 1993, the union was again renovated, adding a new roof, a first floor bookstore, a loading dock, a passenger elevator, a bank, a food court, and barrier-free access.

In the early 2000s, Eastern Michigan began to develop concepts for the expansion of McKenny Union due to its limited space and services in comparison to the university's growing student population. These plans were later dropped due to the high cost of renovating the existing structure to meet the needs of the university. In November 2006, the new Eastern Michigan University Student Center opened on the north end of campus.

== See also ==
- Eastern Michigan University
- Ypsilanti, Michigan
