= Ypsilanti Black Civil War monument =

Monument in Michigan, USA

The Ypsilanti Black Civil War Monument was dedicated in June 2022, during a federal Juneteenth holiday by the city of Ypsilanti at Highland Cemetery, Michigan. The monument depicts three United States Colored soldiers and is meant to honor the state of Michigan's fallen colored troops and veterans who fought in the Civil War (1861–1865).

== History ==
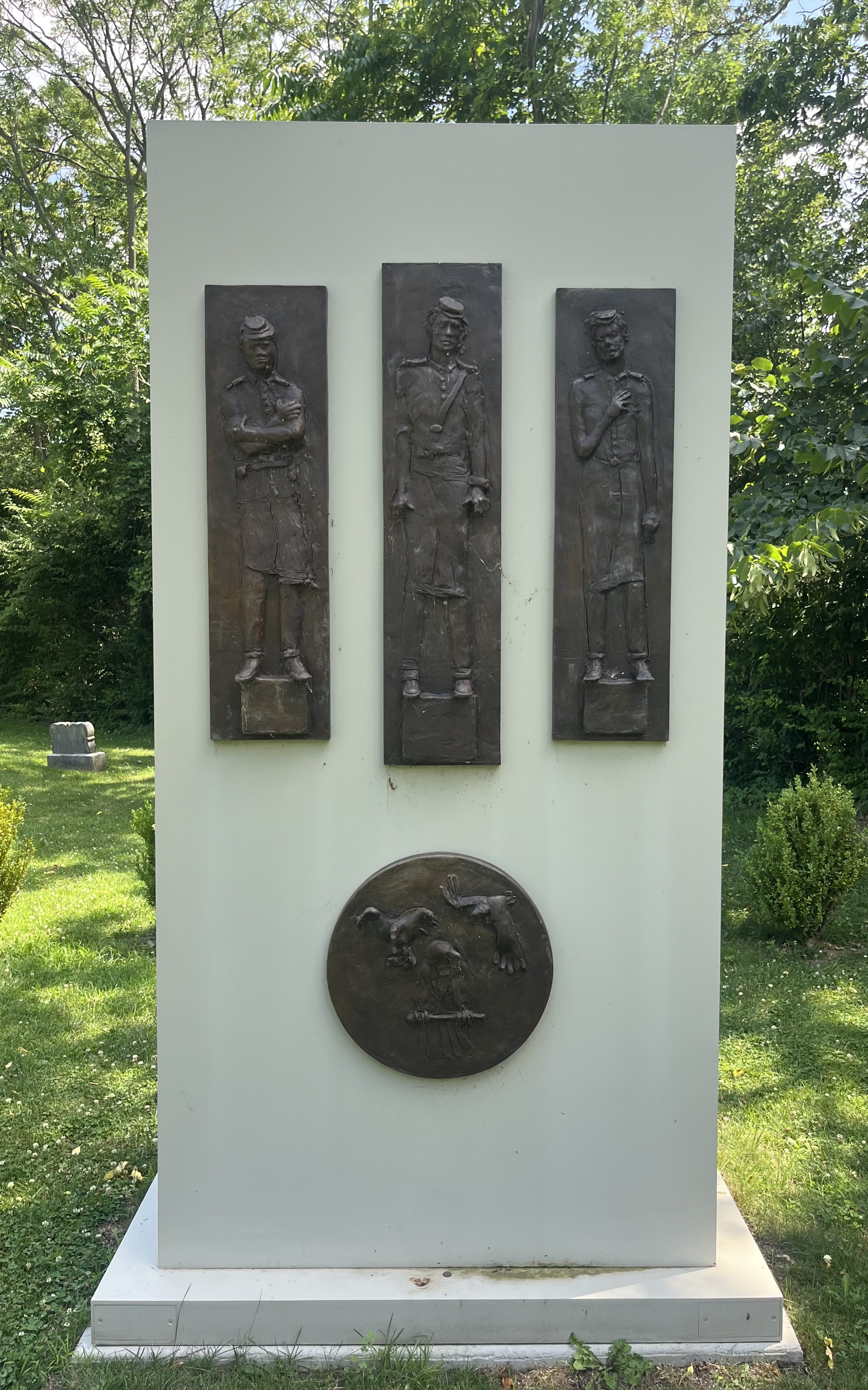
Ypsilanti Black Civil War Monument, sculpted by John Pappas, depicts three USCT soldiers. Located in Ypsilanti Highland Cemetery

The Ypsilanti Highland Cemetery contains nearly 40 Black Civil War casualties or veterans. Cemetery records indicate that there are 19 marked gravesites of Black Civil War Soldiers, and an additional 19 may be buried near the grounds of Highland Cemetery.

The Ypsilanti Black Civil War monument was first initiated when Matt Siegfried, a historian, writer, and researcher located in Ypsilanti, Michigan, noticed the headstone of Pvt. Elias Rouse, a Civil War veteran from the 54th Massachusetts Regiment, within Ypsilanti's Highland Cemetery. This discovery triggered Siegfried to research African American soldiers who fought in the Civil War and who were buried in the cemetery. This research ultimately acted as a catalyst in erecting the memorial honoring Black Civil War veterans.

During his research, Siegfried was able to find two living descendants of Elias Rouse who still lived in Ypsilanti, Cheryl Garnett and Omer Winborn. Through Garnett and Winborn's family research, Siegfried found that Rouse was one of the first men of color to join the Union Army, recruited by Frederick Douglass to fight in the war. On July 18, 1863, during the battle of Fort Wagner, Rouse's regiment gained notability; however, once discharged in 1865, it took until 1890 for him to receive his pension, revealing the racial discrimination against colored veterans after the Civil War ended.

== Description ==
John Pappas, a sculptor based in Ypsilanti, created the Ypsilanti Black Civil War Monument. It features three United States Colored Troops (USCT) soldiers at the top, inspired by historical photos, with three eagles beneath symbolizing war. Pappas purposely excluded the depiction of weaponry within the monument, instead focusing on their faces, trying to capture the contemplation and questioning colored soldiers made when making the life-altering decision to enlist and fight for their freedom.

The memorial also honored several soldiers, including Elias Rouse from the 54th Massachusetts Regiment, James H. Falls and Dudley H. Fox from Co. F, 2nd Michigan Cavalry, and Lonrezo Thompson from Co. E, 11th USCHA, 14th Rhode Island Heavy Artillery.

== Funding ==
According to Michigan Live, the erection of the monument was assisted by State Representative Ronnie Peterson, who helped grant funding for the project, garnering a total of 60,000 dollars. Funding included 5,000 dollars from the Michigan Enhancement Grant, another 5,000 dollars from the Michigan Council for Arts and Cultural Affairs, and a donation of 30,000 dollars from Destination Ann Arbor/Ypsi Real.
