= Eastern Michigan University Historic District =

Historic district in Michigan, United States

- U.S. National Register of Historic Places
- U.S. Historic district
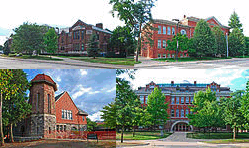
- McKenny Hall, Welch Hall, Starkweather Hall, Sherzer Hall

- Location within Michigan

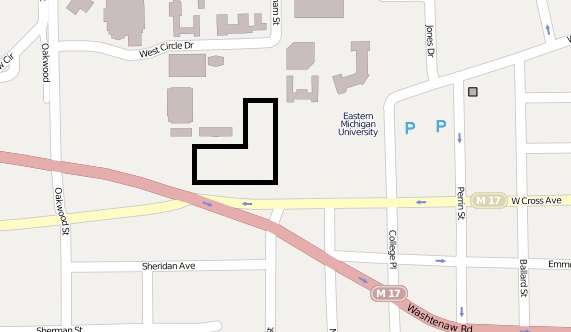
- Map of the Eastern Michigan University Historic District
- Location: Ypsilanti, Michigan
- Coordinates: 42°14′44″N 83°37′29″W
- Area: 8 acres (3 ha)
- Built: 1931
- Architect: Ernest W. Arnold, Frank Eurich Jr., Malcomson and Higginbotham
- Architectural style: Colonial Revival, Art Deco
- NRHP reference No.: 84000017
- Added to NRHP: October 4, 1984

Eastern Michigan University Historic District is a historic district on the very south end of the Eastern Michigan University campus. Eastern Michigan University is a comprehensive, co-educational public university located in Ypsilanti, Michigan in Washtenaw County. The university was founded in 1849 as Michigan State Normal School. Several buildings since its founding have achieved historical significance, and the district was eventually established on the National Register of Historic Places in 1984.

== The district ==
The Eastern Michigan University Historic District is set on an "L-shaped parcel" of land across from the Ypsilanti Water Tower (also on the NRHP). The EMUHD area contains Welch Hall, Starkweather hall, Sherzer Hall, and McKenny Hall. All four buildings are unique in their design and make up.

The four buildings are all substantial structures. Each building has a unique style and structure design. Beyond this each building was built at different times to serve unique purposes for the campus. The district was established in 1984.

== Buildings ==
=== McKenny Hall ===
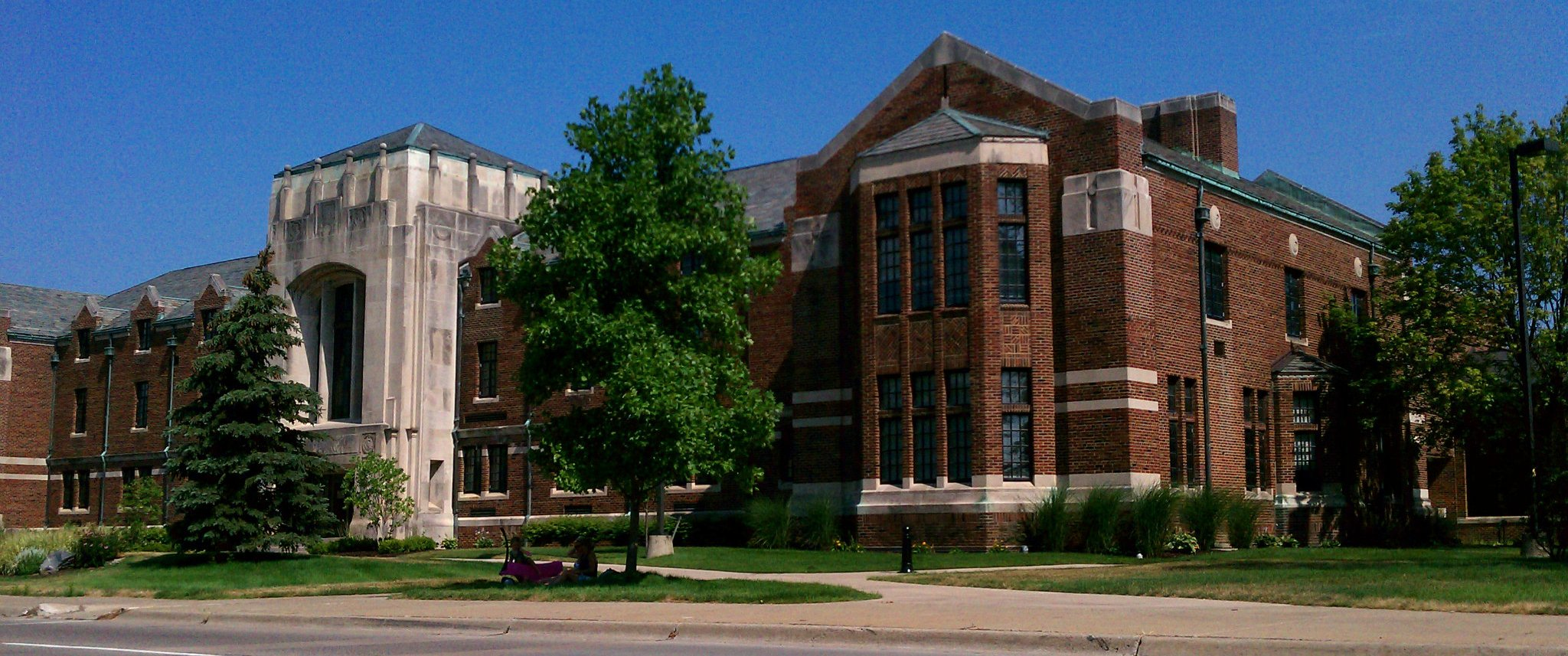
McKenny Hall

Previously called McKenny Union and Charles McKenny Union, was the first student union on the campus of a teachers' college when it opened in 1931. McKenny hall was designed by Detroit architect Frank Eurich Jr. of Detroit. The building, in the collegiate gothic style with some art deco features. Today the building is known as McKenny Hall and is home to veteran services, human resources, and career services. After The EMU Student Center opened, McKenny closed in 2006 for renovations to preserve the building's age. Since then the university uses the historic building as office space for various departments.

=== Sherzer Hall ===
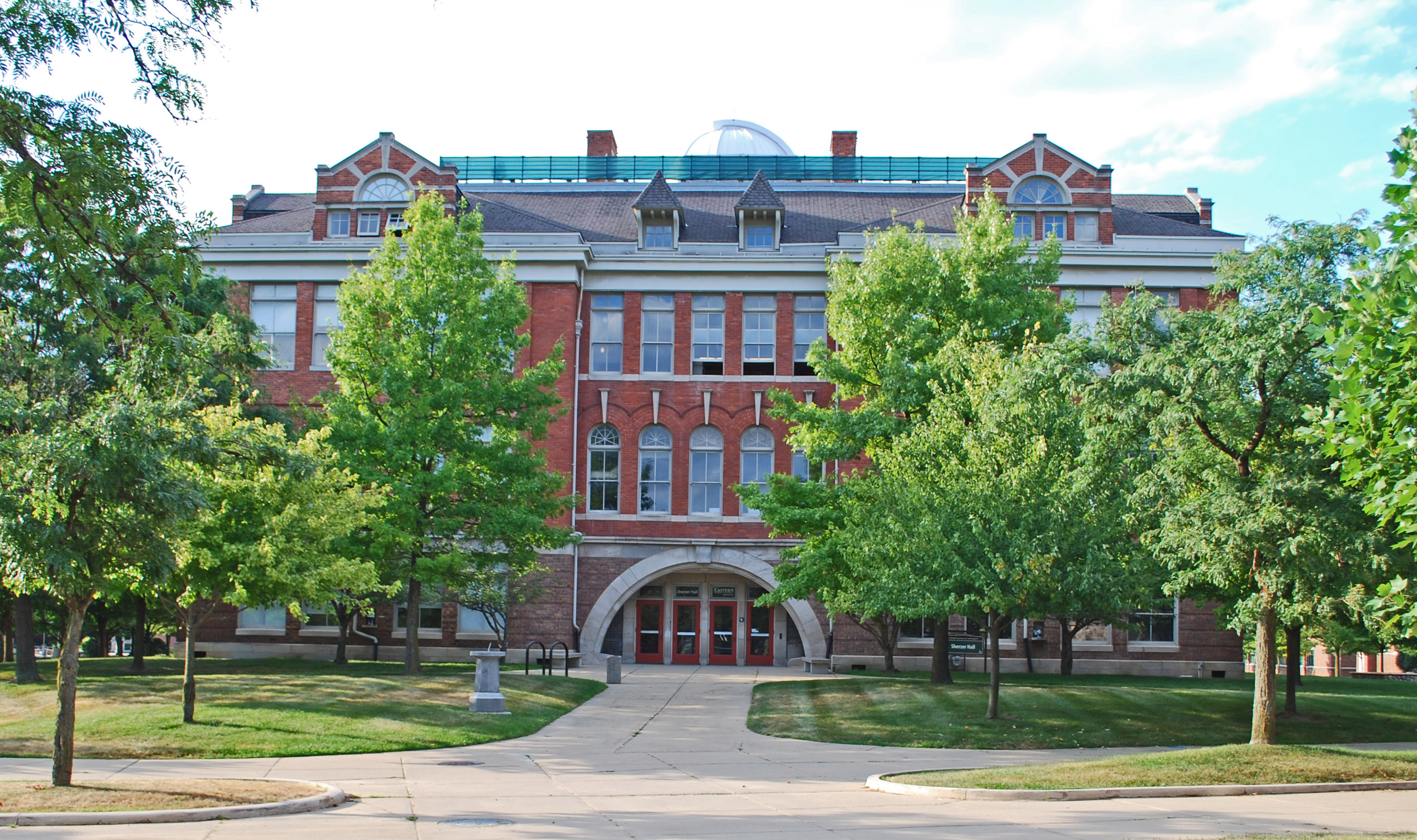
Sherzer Hall

Sherzer Hall is classroom building, which currently also houses Art Department studios. Sherzer Observatory, an astronomical observatory owned and operated by the Department of Physics and Astronomy, was established in 1878 with a gift from the citizens of Ypsilanti of a four-inch (102 mm) refractor. The observatory, originally located on Pierce Hall, was hit by a tornado and destroyed in 1893. It was then relocated to the roof of the new Natural Science Building in 1903. The architect of the building was E. W.. Arnold of Battle Creek. The building has survived two fires, in 1973 and 1989.

=== Starkweather Hall ===
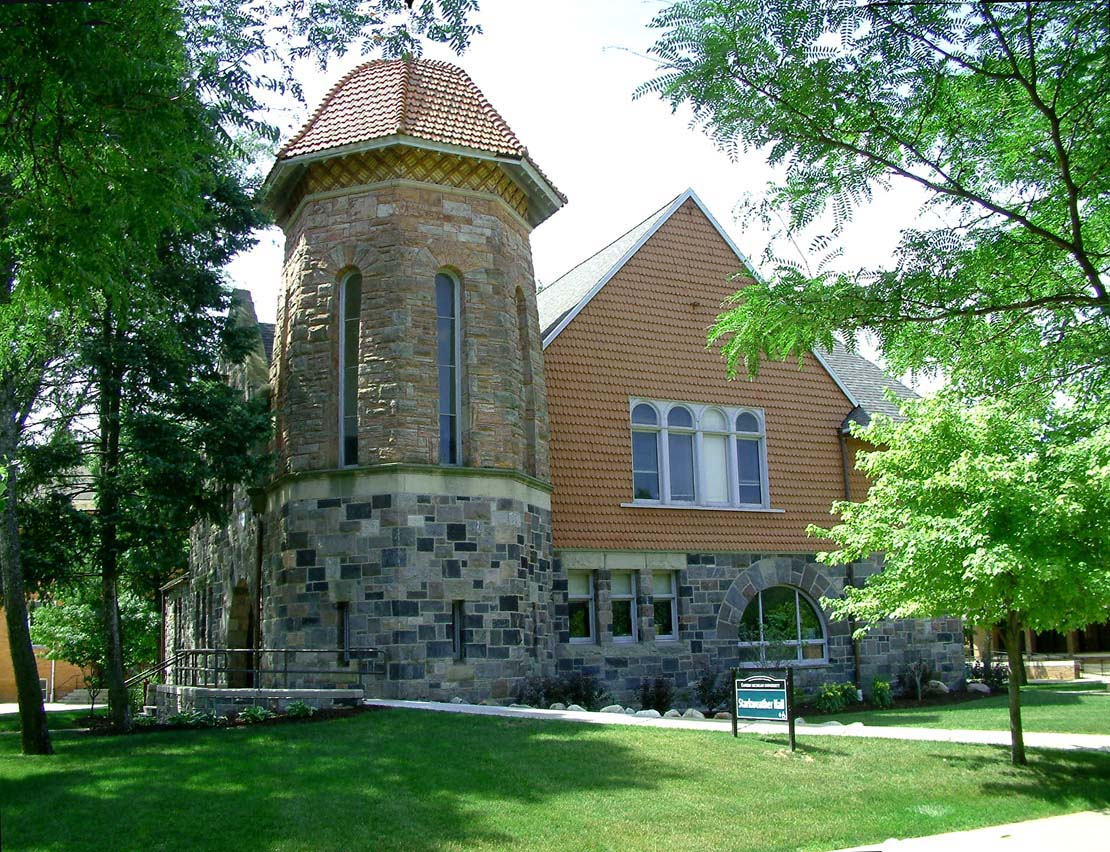
Starkweather Hall

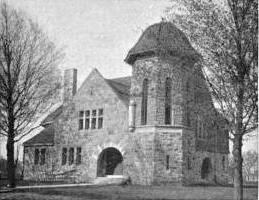
Starkweather Hall, c.1899

Starkweather Hall is the oldest building still standing on EMU's campus. Originally built for the Student Christian Association by a local philanthropist, Mrs. Starkweather. Eventually the building was given to the university and has housed various academic offices and programs. Today, the building is home to the Honors College. In parts of the building, the original doorknobs remain, bearing the initials "SCA" for the Student Christian Association.

==== Architecture ====
Starkweather is a red-brick exteriors with random Ashlar and clay tile cladding. The building is designed in the Richardsonian Romanesque style. Starkweather Hall was placed on the National Register of Historic Places in 1977. Buildings that sit near Starkweather Hall include Welch Hall, McKenny Hall, and Sherzer Hall.

==== Honors college ====
The EMU Honors Program started in 1984 with approximately 230 students. The program started under the guidance of Robert Holkeboer who was the dean of the Graduate School. In July 2005 the program became a college within the university. Today Honors Housing is in Downing Hall. Past locations included Wise Hall, Jones, and Goddard Halls. Today the Honors College Office are housed in Starkweather Hall.

=== Welch Hall ===
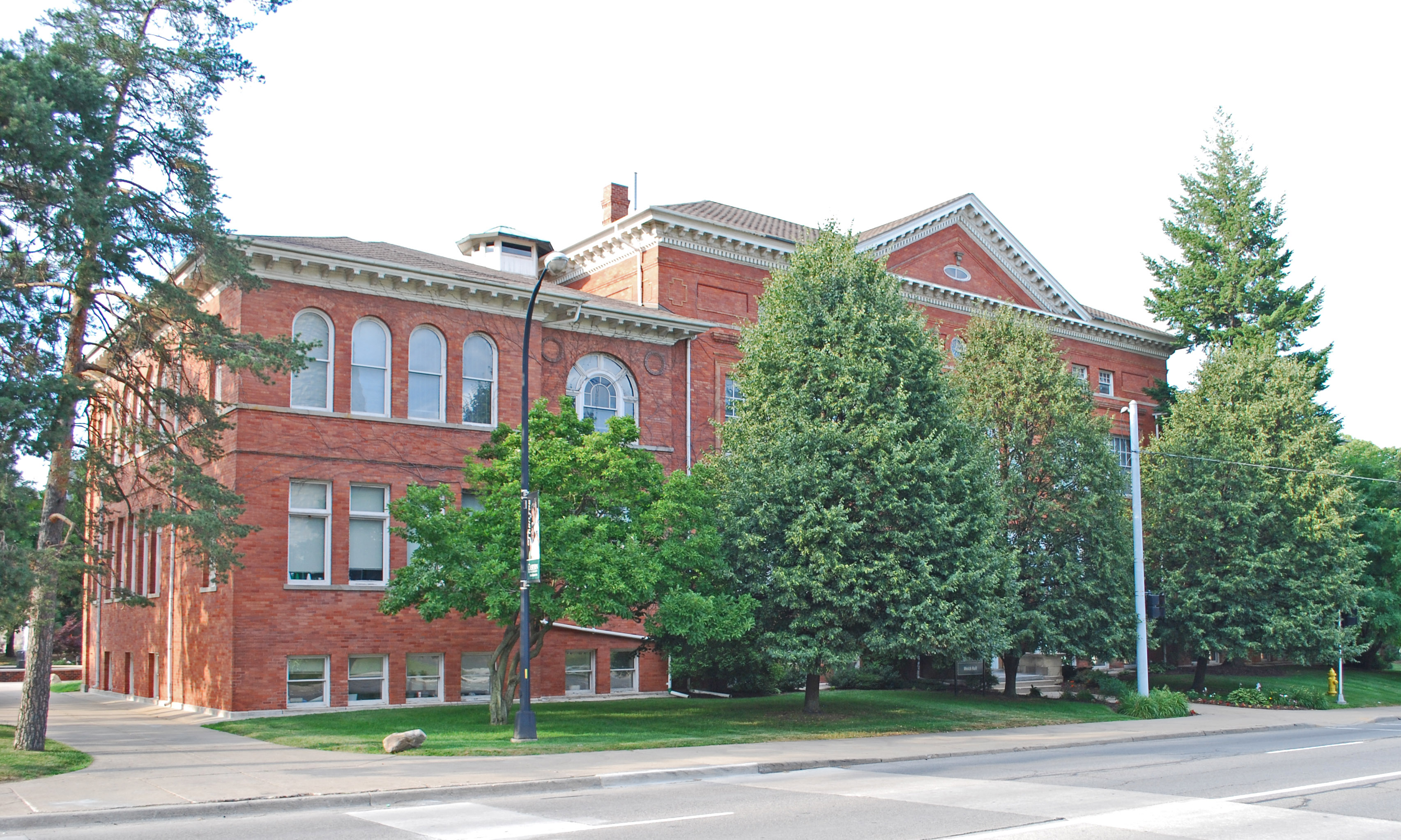
Welch Hall

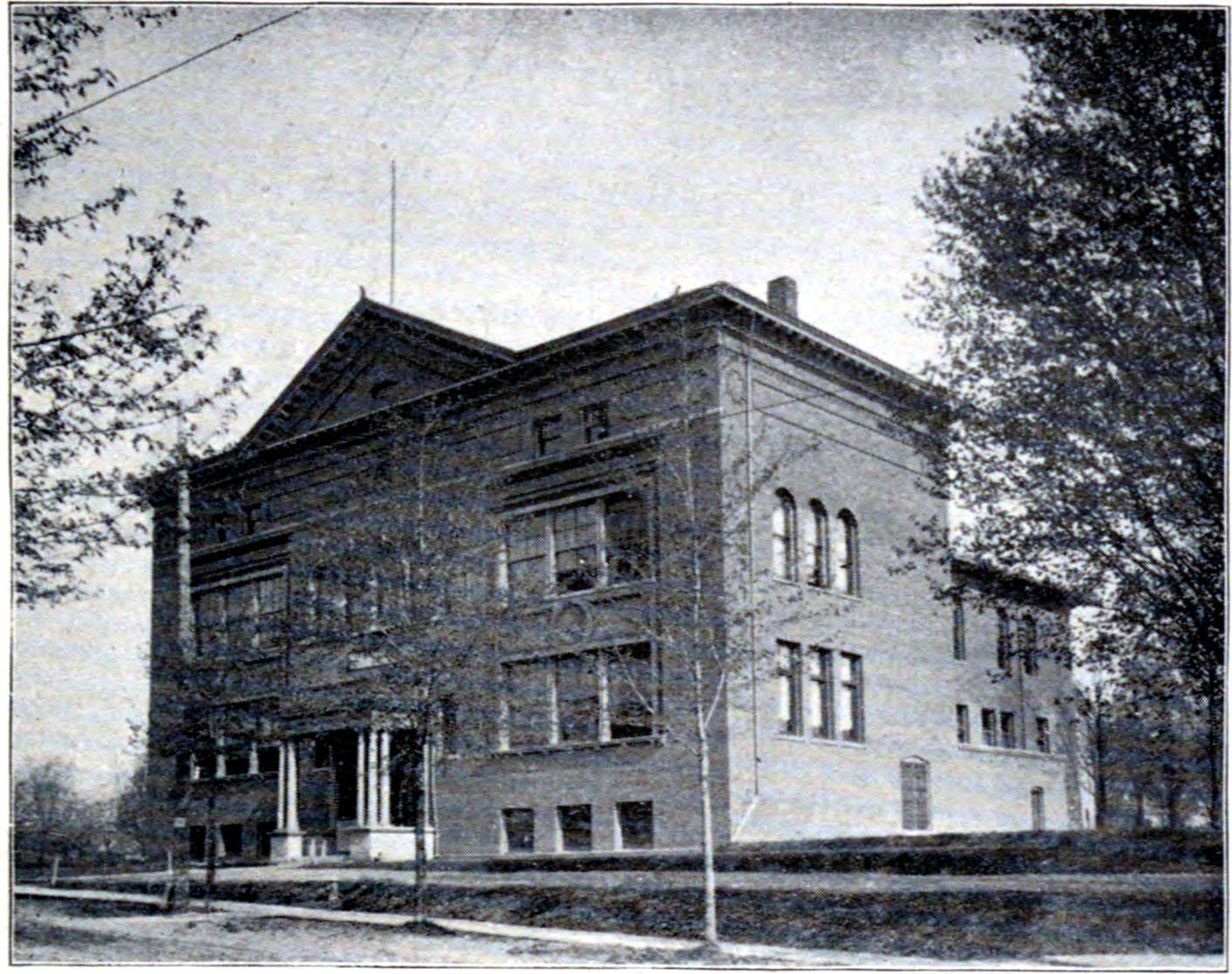
Welch Hall, 1897

Welch Hall was constructed in 1895 and was completed three days after Starkweather Hall. Welch Hall is the second oldest building on the EMU campus. The building is named after Adonijah S. Welch. Welch served as the First President of Normal Training School. The building is designed after Georgian Revival Architecture style Architecture. The building's original name was the "Training School" and served as the Teacher Training School from 1896 to the 1960s. During the building's lifetime, Welch has served as classroom space and various department offices. A wing next to McKinny Union was removed in the late 1960s. Due to poor maintenance the building was closed during the 1980s and almost demolished, but was saved by the "Don't Squelch Welch" movement originating in the university's historic preservation program.

==== Architecture ====
Welch has red-brick exteriors while Starkweather Hall has random ashlar masonry and clay tile cladding. Welch hall is a Georgian Revival style. Sherzer's no-nonsense exterior has a few mildly Romanesque and Georgian elements but defies stylistic classification, McKenny Hall's detailing is Art Deco but the structure alone is Tudor Revival. In 1984, Welch Hall was added to the National Register of Historic Places. Today, Welch Hall houses EMU's executive offices which includes the Office of the President. Welch Hall is the second oldest building on campus by three days behind Starkweather Hall.

== See also ==
- Eastern Michigan University
- Ypsilanti Water Tower
- Pease Auditorium
