= Starkweather Hall =

- Starkweather Religious Center
- U.S. National Register of Historic Places
- Michigan State Historic Site
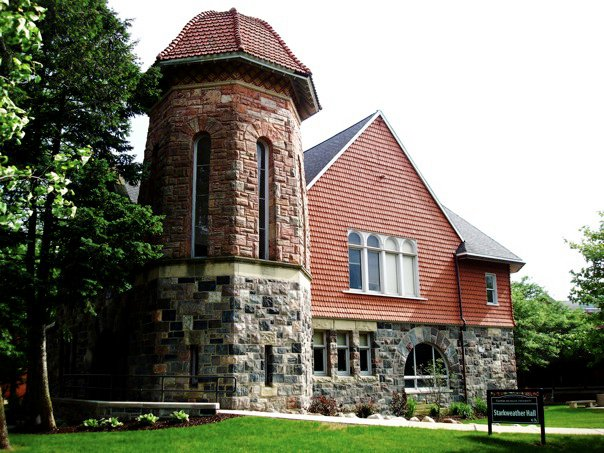

- Location within Michigan Location within the United States
- Interactive map
- Location: 901 W. Forest, Ypsilanti, Michigan
- Coordinates: 42°14′47″N 83°37′27″W
- Area: less than one acre
- Built: 1896
- Architect: Malcomson and Higginbotham
- Architectural style: Richardsonian Romanesque
- NRHP reference No.: 77000724

Significant dates
- Added to NRHP: April 13, 1977
- Designated MSHS: September 29, 1972

Starkweather Hall, also known as Starkweather Religious Center, is a religious and educational building located at 901 West Forest Avenue in Ypsilanti, Michigan, on the campus of Eastern Michigan University. It was designated as a Michigan State Historic Site in 1972 and listed on the National Register of Historic Places in 1977. It is also part of the Eastern Michigan University Historic District (listed on the Register in 1984) and is the oldest building on EMU's campus.

== History ==
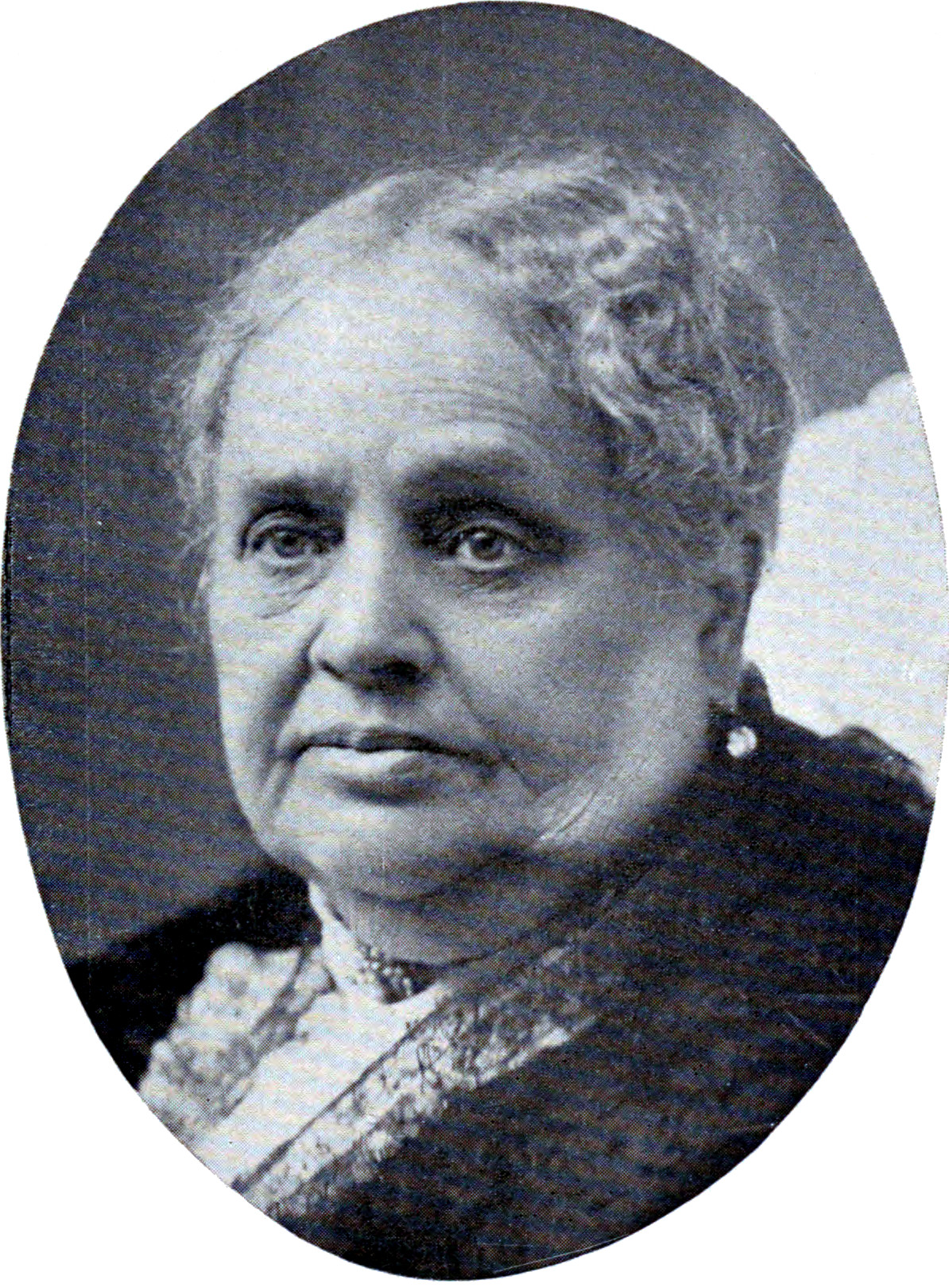
Mary Ann Starkweather

The Students' Christian Association at Eastern Michigan University (then Michigan State Normal School) was begun as the Students' Prayer Meeting in 1853, the same year the school itself opened. Meetings were held in assembly or classrooms of the school. In 1881, the society reorganized as the Students' Christian Association, and they were granted a room in the campus conservatory building as a meeting place. However, in 1891, the room was required for classes, and the Association was homeless. They soon decided to gather funds to erect a new building. By early 1892, nearly $1000 had been pledged, and the Association appealed to philanthropist Mary Ann Starkweather for additional funding. She agreed to bequeath an additional $10,000 for the purpose of constructing a building; the funds were disbursed in late 1895. Detroit architects Malcomson and Higginbotham were hired to design the building, and it was constructed in 1896 at a cost of slightly over $11,000. The Starkweather Religious Center was dedicated on March 26, 1897. When it was constructed, it was the only religious center at any teacher's college in the United States. After construction, it was leased to the University's Students' Christian Association.

The Students' Christian Association was disbanded in the 1920s, but Starkweather Hall continued to be used by a succession of religious organizations. The building was renovated in 1961 by Jickling and Lyman of Birmingham, Michigan. In 1976, the Office of Religious Affairs, which used the building at that point, was closed. The building was again remodeled, and used by public relations services. As of 2013, it is used by the Graduate Office.

== Description ==
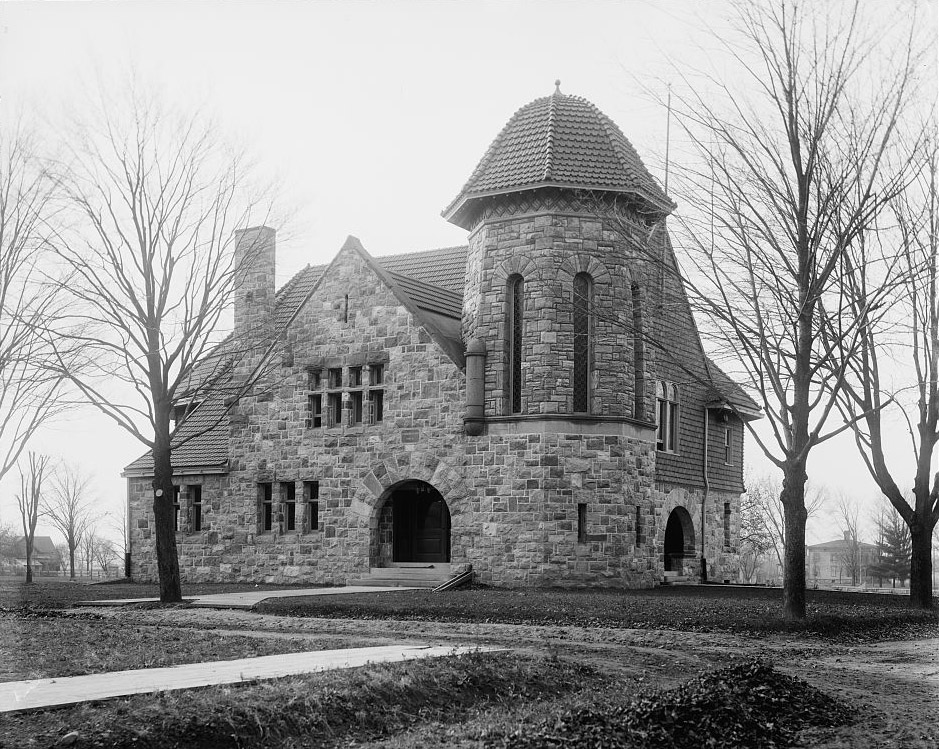
Starkweather Hall, c. 1910

Starkweather Hall is a two-story Richardsonian Romanesque structure built of squared fieldstone, covering approximately 62 feet (19 m) by 56 feet (17 m). It is asymmetrical, with an octagonal sandstone tower on one corner and a gable over the front entrance. Fishscale orange tile covers the top halves of the other facades. On the interior, the first floor originally contained dining/reception rooms, a kitchen, a dressing room, a library, and a few classrooms. The rooms were delineated by partitions that could be rolled open to create a larger space. The second floor originally contained a large assembly room and a caretaker's room. Hardware was designed especially for the building, and some original doorknobs, marked "SCA," still remain.
