= Sherzer Observatory =

Astronomical observatory at Eastern Michigan University

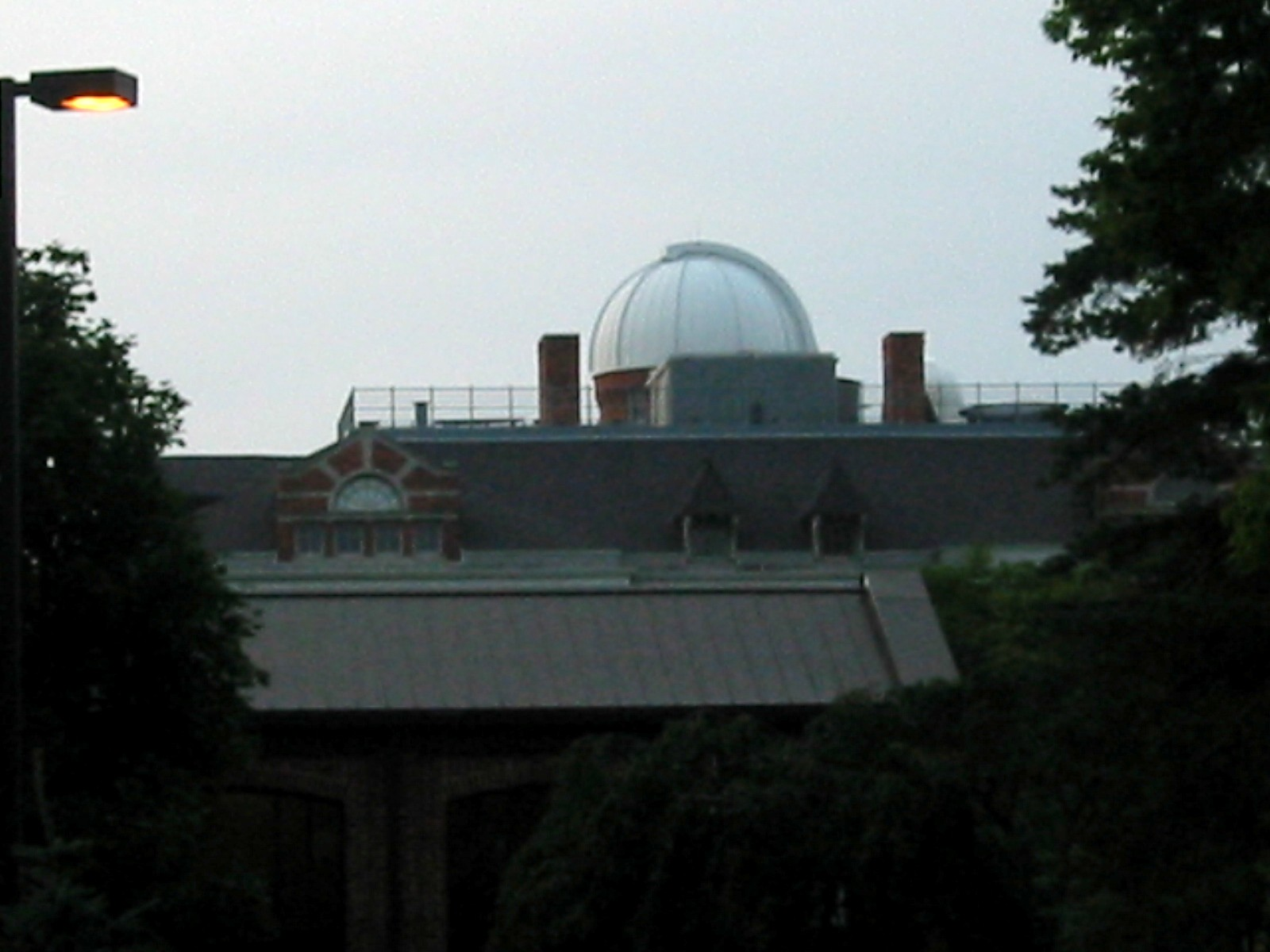
- Sherzer Observatory at dusk
- Organization: Eastern Michigan University
- Location: Ypsilanti, Mi
- Coordinates: 42.1550°N 83.372856°W
- Established: 1878
- Website: www.physics.emich.edu/sherzer/

Telescopes
- Unnamed Telescope: 10-inch (250 mm) f/14 apochromatic refractor with 4-inch (100 mm) apochromatic refractor guide scope
- Related media on Commons

Sherzer Observatory is an astronomical observatory located on the campus of Eastern Michigan University. The observatory was established in 1903 with the construction of the new Natural Science Building, in Ypsilanti, Michigan. Following a devastating fire in 1989 a new observatory opened in September 1991 with a 10-inch (250 mm) apochromatic refractor telescope and German equatorial mount centered under a 6-meter dome.

== History ==
The Michigan State Normal College received a gift from the citizens of Ypsilanti: a 4-inch (100 mm), $600 Alvan Clark refractor. The original observatory was located on old Pierce Hall and was damaged by a tornado and destroyed in 1893. It was then relocated to the roof of the new Natural Science Building in 1903. The building and observatory was later named after William Sherzer, a science professor at the school who conceived the design for the new building after seeing similar facilities on a visit to Germany.

In 1928, a 10-inch (250 mm) refractor telescope manufactured by telescope maker and amateur astronomer John Mellish was installed on a German equatorial mount built by physics professor Edwin Strong. The University Archives still has data produced by students using this telescope and the brass Negus transit telescope which shared the observatory with the Mellish refractor.

In the 1970s and 1980s, members of the EMU student astronomy club made numerous updates and restorations to keep the aging observatory running. Almost half of Sherzer Hall was destroyed in a fire in 1989, including the original observatory. The university decided to rebuild.

The new observatory opened in September 1991 with a 10-inch (250 mm) apochromatic refractor telescope and German equatorial mount centered under a 6-meter dome. A classroom/computer lab was finished in 1997, and additional 8-inch (200 mm) to 14-inch (360 mm) telescopes, CCD cameras, and other equipment added to the inventory for student use. A secondary observatory with an automated 8-inch (200 mm) SCT for CCD imaging was added to the rooftop level, becoming operational in 2008.

== Sherzer Hall ==
Sherzer Hall is an academic building on the Eastern Michigan University campus, located in Ypsilanti, Michigan. Sherzer Hall is one of four buildings comprising the Eastern Michigan University Historic District on the National Register of Historic Places. The building was designed by E. W.. Arnold of Battle Creek and has survived two fires, one in 1973 and another in 1989. The fire in 1989 caused extensive damage that nearly burned the entire building to the ground. Sherzer Hall has a red-brick exterior combined with Richardsonian Richardsonian Romanesque and Georgian Revival elements. Due to its unique style causes it to defies stylistic classification. Sherzer also is home to Sherzer Observatory which was established in 1878 and eventually moved to the top of Sherzer Hall in 1903.

== See also ==
- List of astronomical observatories
