= Student center =

Building at a college or university for student activities

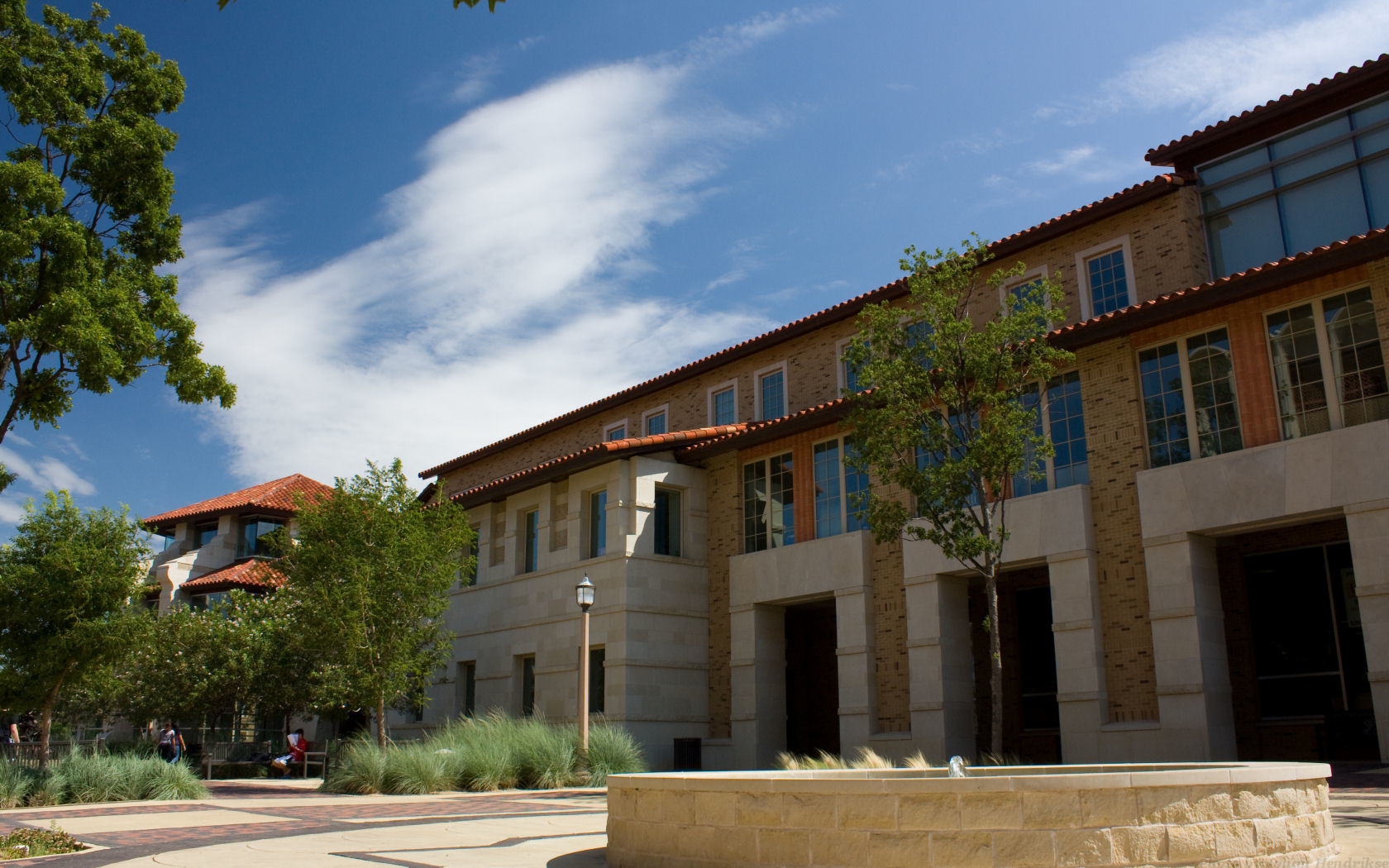
Student Activity Center on the campus of Texas Tech University

A student center (or student centre) is a type of building found on university and some high school campuses. In the United States, such a building may also be called a student union, student commons, or union.

The term "student union" refers most often in the United States to a building, while in other nations a "students' union" is the student government. Nevertheless, the Association of College Unions International (largely US-based) has several hundred campus organizational members in the US; these members typically operate the buildings, which are the most visible service provided by the organizations. This led to the student union buildings becoming known simply as "student unions" after the organizations which own them.

== History ==
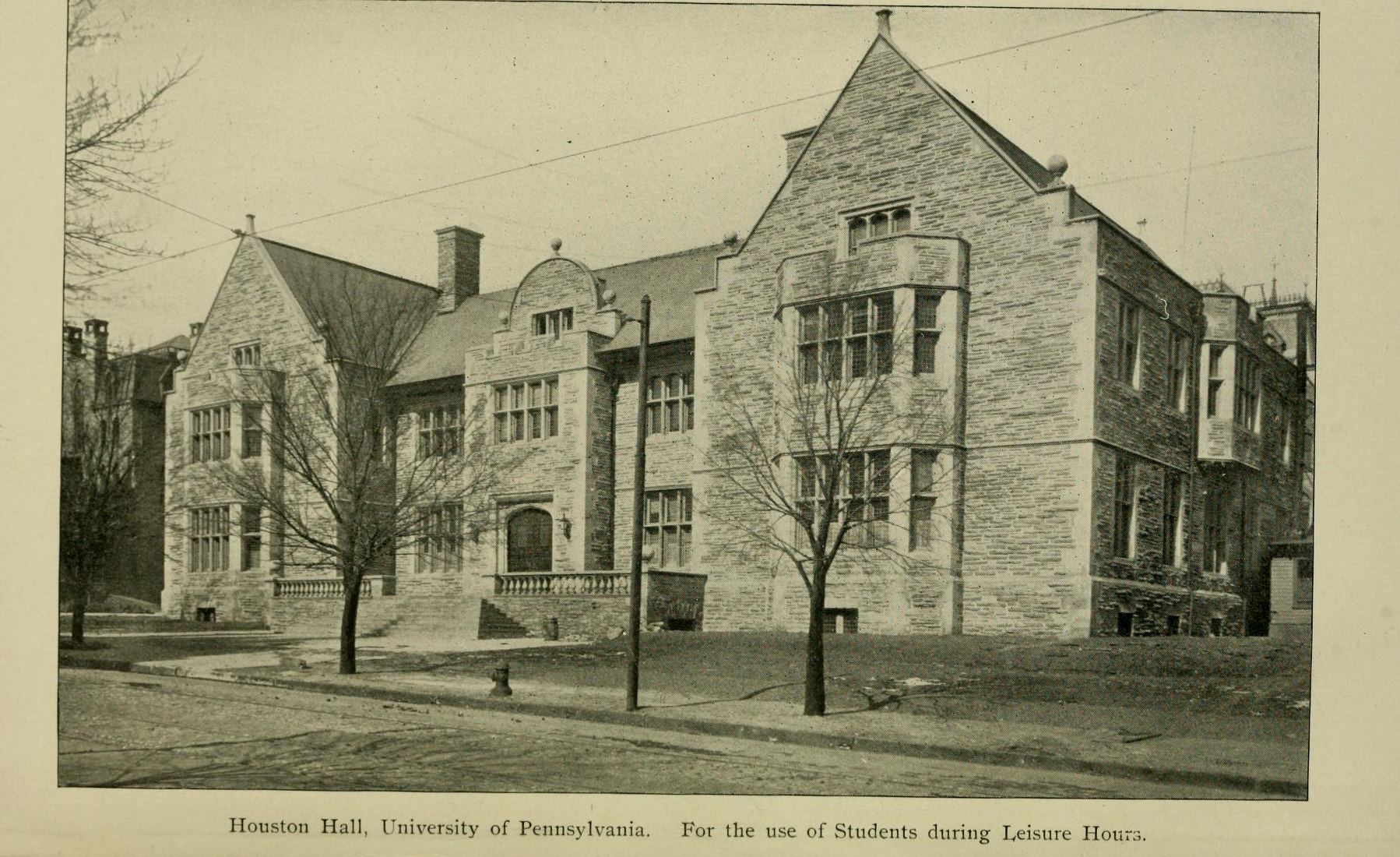
Photograph of Houston Hall of University of Pennsylvania taken in 1896, the year the student center was opened.

The first student union in America was Houston Hall, at the University of Pennsylvania, which opened January 2, 1896 and remains in operation to this day. The first Ohio Union at Ohio State University was Enarson Hall. The building opened in 1911 and was the first student union to be built at a state university and the fourth of its kind in the United States. Oklahoma State University's student union opened in 1950. Subsequent additions, and renovations in 2010, have made the building one of the largest student activity centers in the world at 611,000 sq ft (56,800 m^{2}).

Some student centers carry unique origins and historical significance with some on the National Register of Historic Places. The William Pitt Union was originally constructed in 1898 as a hotel and was converted into a student center in 1956. Some student activity centers on the NRHP include O'Hara Student Center (University of Pittsburgh), McKenny Hall (Eastern Michigan University), and the Tivoli Student Union. The Tivoli Student Union was originally home to the Trevoli Brewing Company but since has been converted to serve several institutions in Denver, Colorado.

In 2007, the University of Vermont's student center became the first LEED Gold certification by the U.S. Green Building Council.

Other examples of student centers include West Virginia University's Mountainlair, the J. Wayne Reitz Union at the University of Florida, the Bronco Student Center at Cal Poly Pomona, the McCormick Tribune Campus Center at the Illinois Institute of Technology, and Price Center at UC San Diego.

The first student center in the United Kingdom was at the University of Liverpool, built 1910–1913 for the Liverpool Guild of Students and listed on the National Heritage List for England from 1975. Another historically important student center is Newcastle University Students' Union Building, built in 1924 for what was then Armstrong College of Durham University and listed from 1987. Many student centers were built as part of the rapid expansion of higher education in the UK following World War II with architectural styles ranging from classical to modernist; the brutalist Dunelm House, built in 1966 for Durham Students' Union, is considered "the foremost students’ union building of the post-war era in England" and was listed in 2021. As of 2021, these are the only three student centers to have been listed in England. The conversion of former polytechnics to universities in 1992 sparked further construction of student centers at the new universities, examples including the students' union buildings of Sunderland University and the University of the West of Scotland, both built in 2004.

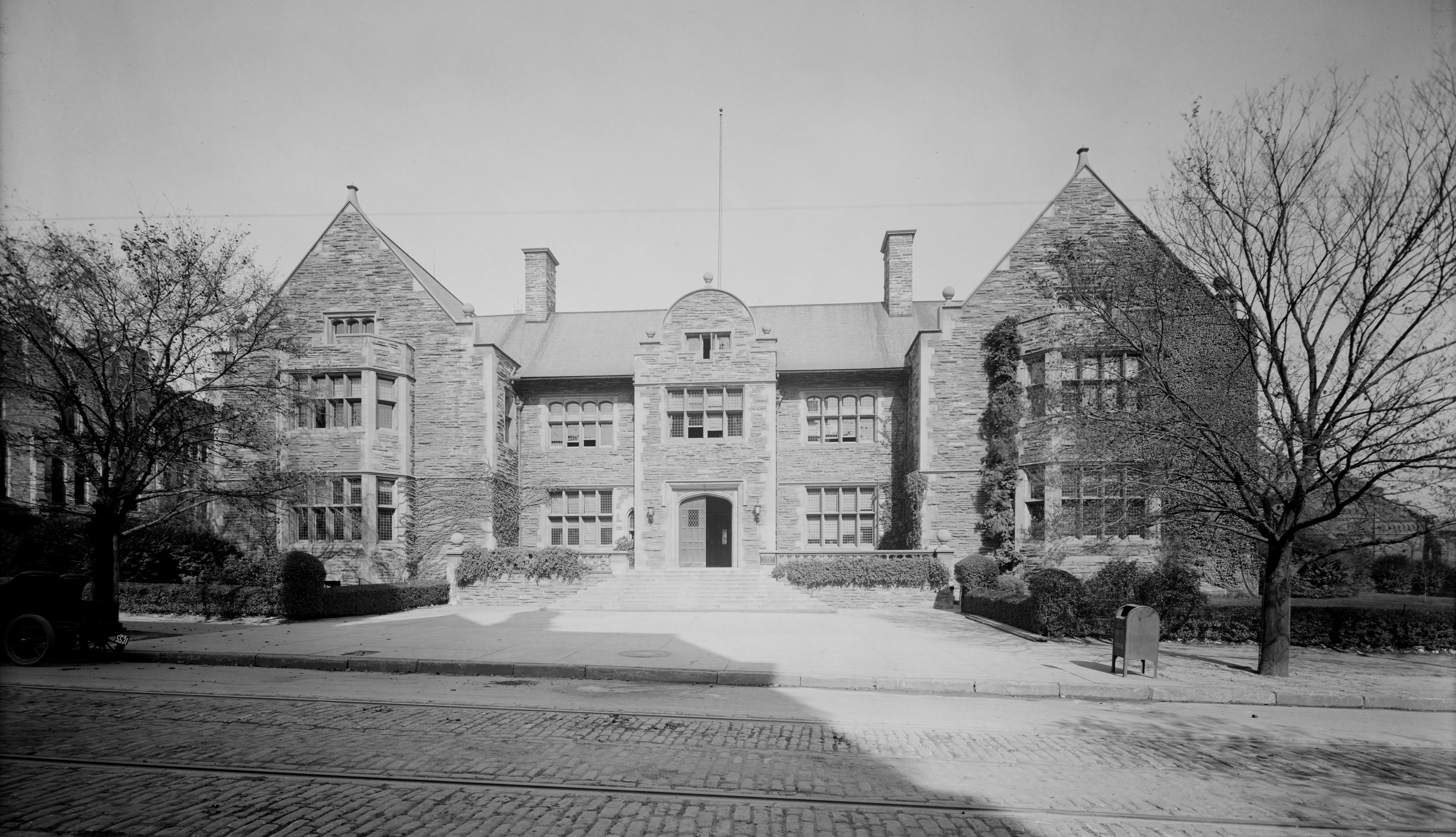
The first student activity center in America was Houston Hall at the University of Pennsylvania

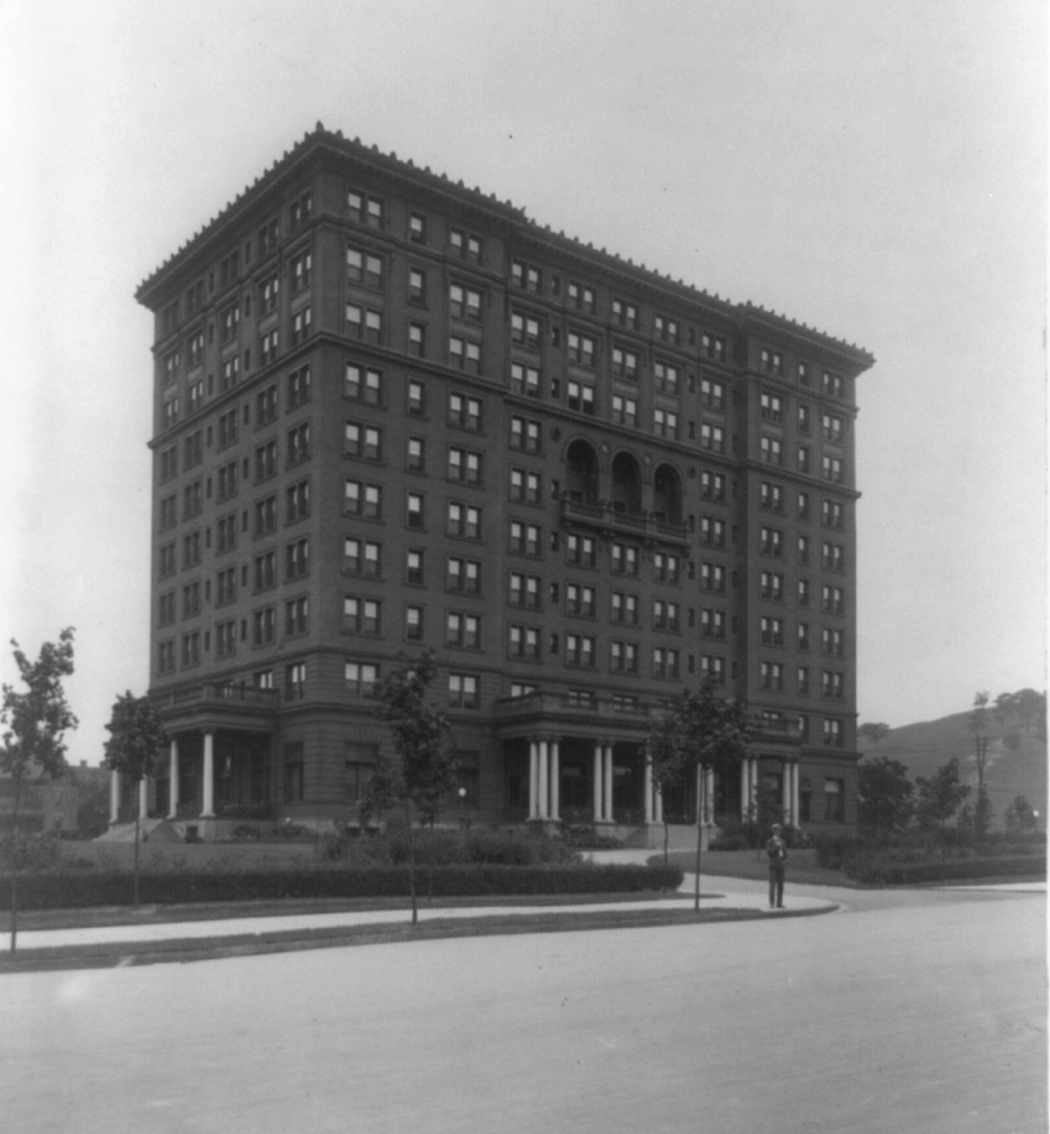
The William Pitt Union as the Schenley Hotel

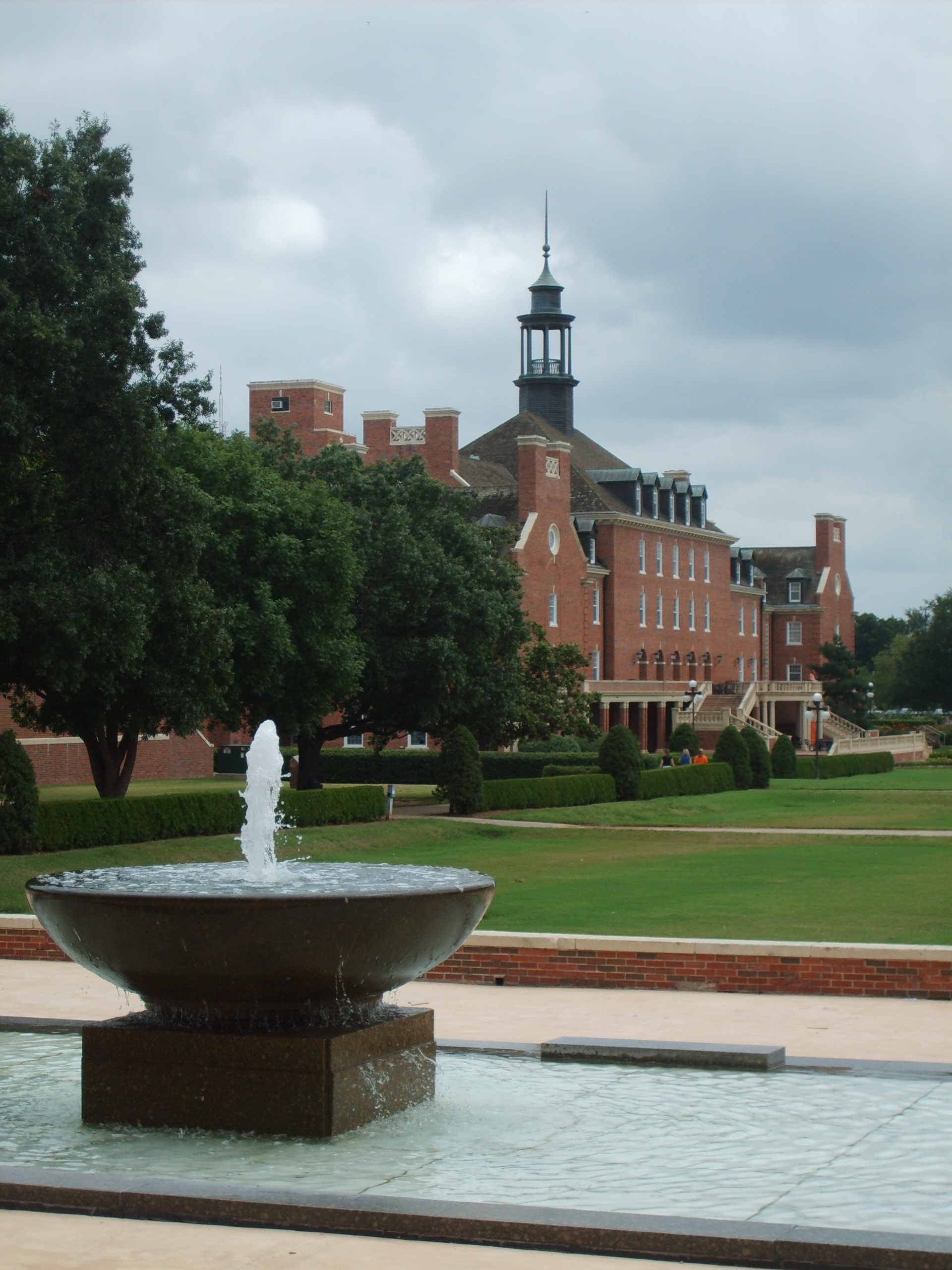
Student Union at Oklahoma State University

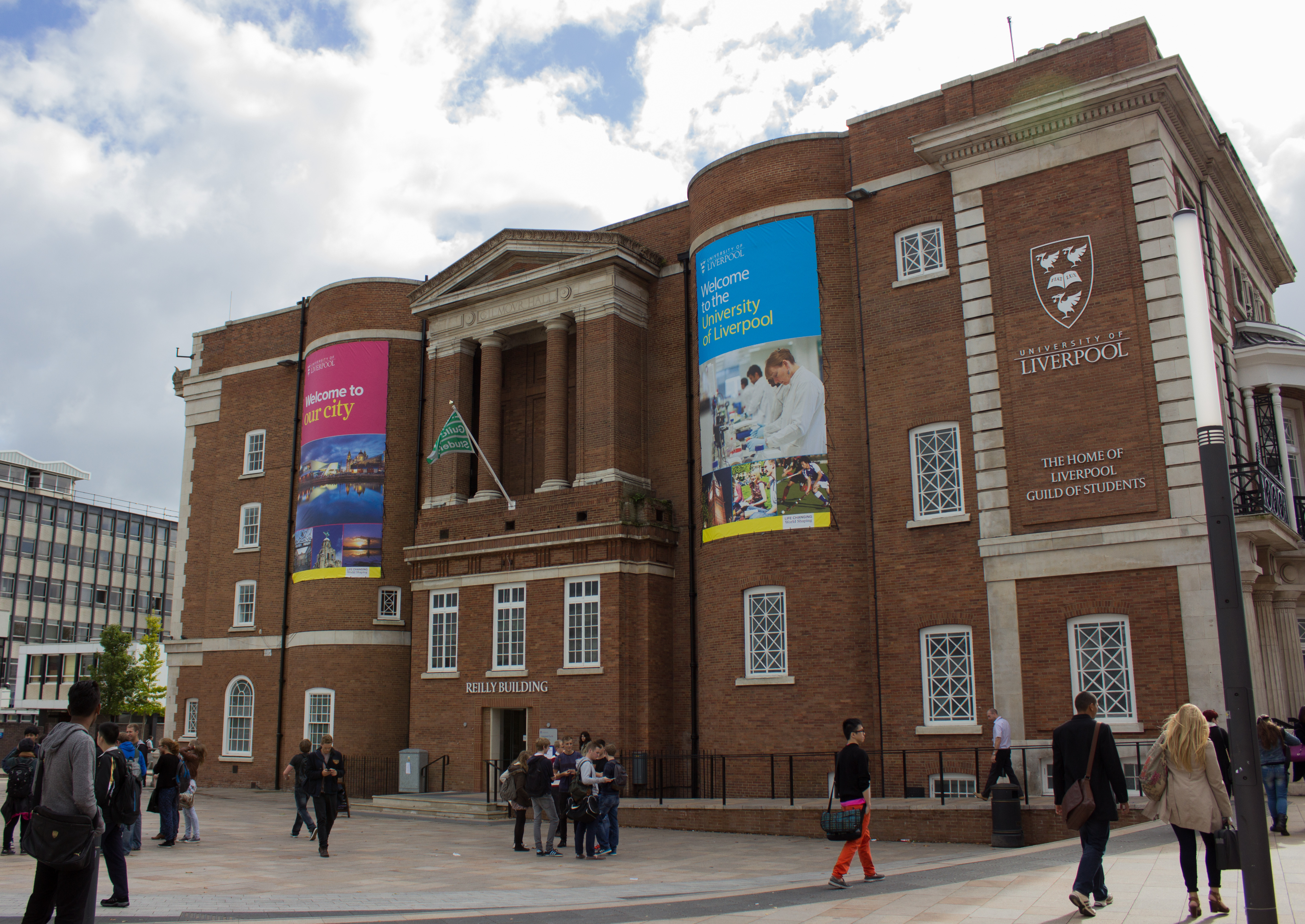
Liverpool Guild of Students building at the University of Liverpool, the first student center in the UK

Students' Union building at Newcastle University

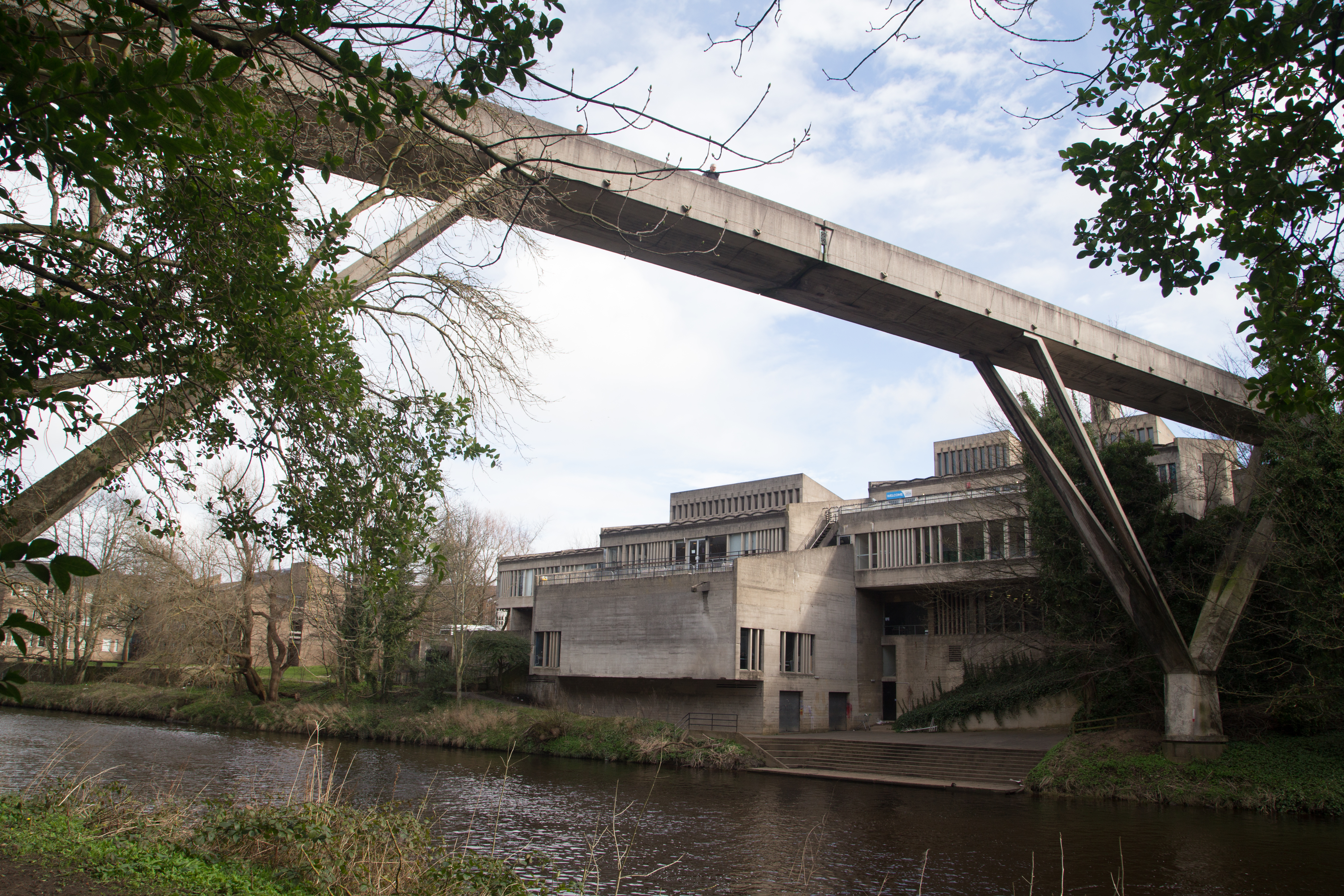
Dunelm House at Durham University, seen through Kingsgate Bridge

== Purpose ==
Broadly speaking, the facility is devoted to student recreation and socialization. A student center or student union is the community center of the college, serving students, faculty, staff, alumni, and guests. A student activity center might offer a variety of programs, activities, services, and facilities.

It may contain lounges, wellness centers, dining facilities or vendors, and entertainment venues. The student center is often the center of student affairs and activities and may house the offices of the student government or other student groups. It may also act as a small conference center, with its meeting rooms rented out to student groups and local organizations holding conferences or competitions. An example of this for instance is the Michigan Union, which hosts the University of Michigan Model United Nations conference.

Depending on the school and its location it might have unique amenities such as a bowling alley, cultural or prayer rooms and unique services. At the Eastern Michigan University Student Center, the building offers a kiva, a round, 360-degree room patterned after spaces used in Native American cultures. The Kiva Room at EMU is used as a meeting space, for collaboration, or for musical purposes. In the Ohio State University-Ohio Union, the student union offers an interfaith prayer room which has feet washing area for Muslim students. The University of Central Florida has an eyewear and optometric consumer service location. Likewise, a Canadian example would be at the University of Waterloo where the student life centre holds many different businesses and services such as a dentist office, a used book store, piano rooms and study rooms that can be reserved for use, and a multi-faith prayer room.

== See also ==
- Association of College Unions International
- Student activities
