= Eastern Michigan University Student Center =

- Interactive map of the Eastern Michigan University; Student Center area
- Alternative names: Student Center

General information
- Type: Student union
- Architectural style: Post Modern
- Location: Ypsilanti, Michigan, USA, 900 Oakwood St. Ypsilanti, MI 48197
- Groundbreaking: 2004
- Construction started: 2006
- Cost: $33 million (2006)
- Landlord: Director Ann Klaes

Technical details
- Floor count: 4
- Floor area: 181,000 sq ft

Design and construction
- Architect: Burt Hill Kosar Rittelmann Associates
- Main contractor: Turner Construction
- Designations: Kiva Room, LAN Gaming Center

Other information
- Parking: yes

Website
- www.emich.edu/studentcenter/

The Eastern Michigan University Student Center is Eastern Michigan University's student union. Since its opening in 2006 the EMU Student Center replaced McKenny Union as the student hub of campus life. The building is simply referred to as "The Student Center" by students faculty and staff. In 2017 the Student Center was named the number one student union in the country by the College Rank. The building is located in University Park near the Rec/IM and Library. It is also the location of the EMU Bookstore, a 24/7 computer lab, two art galleries, various offices and Admissions. The Student Center also includes the Kiva Room.

== History ==
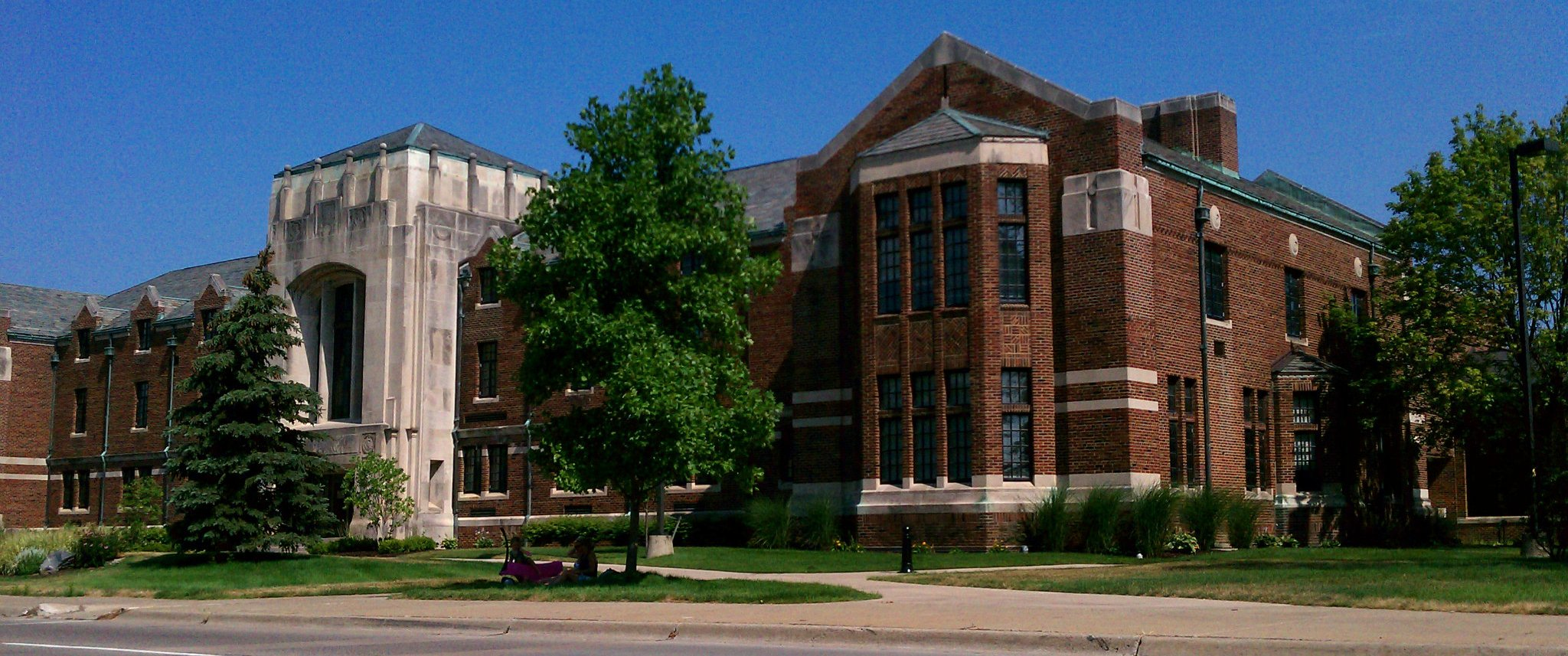
McKenny Hall

Eastern Michigan University's first student union was McKenny Union, first proposed by President Charles McKenny in 1924. McKenny Union opened in 1931, and was the first student union on the campus of a teachers' college. In the early 2000s, EMU began to look at a possible expansion and renovation of McKenny Union. The university found that constructing a new student center and renovating McKenny would be cheaper. The firm of Burt Hill Kosar Rittelmann Associates was hired to design the new building with Turner Construction as the builder, and in 2004, work began on the former site of Pine Grove Apartments and tennis courts. The building officially opened on November 17, 2006. Since its opening, the EMU Student Center uses the slogan "Centered on You!". Following its opening, the Student Center created "a new hub of activity on north side of campus". Once the Student Center opened, McKenny Union closed for renovations and reopened as McKenny Hall. Despite criticism from some faculty members about the expense, the opening of the new student center was considered one of the high points of John A. Fallon's troubled two-year tenure as president of EMU. A poll of campus community members found that the student center was considered one of EMU's top ten improvements between 2002 and 2012.

== Facility ==
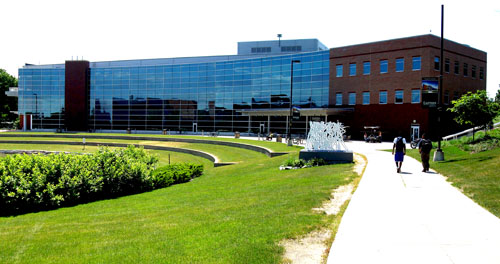
Student center view of the east side

The building offers student services, a Chase Bank branch, dining facilities, meeting rooms, two art galleries, administrative offices, student organization offices, an auditorium, a 24-hour computer lab, a Kiva Room, bookstore and a gaming center. The cost of the Student Center is estimated around $40.5 million (USD). The building's architectural style is Post Modern. The building is approximately 181,000 square feet (16,800 m^{2}) in size. The building is located in University Park near the Rec/IM and Library. During the buildings construction a lake was made adjacent to the Student Center. This completed the area known as "University Park". Outside the building to the south is a small reconstructed prairie and a bridge. The Student Center is home to offices such as Campus Life, VISION, a box office, Service EMU, and Admissions. The Student Center was the home of the first LAN Gaming Center (Savage Geckos); purchased by the university in Spring 2008 and renamed E-Zone.

Current food vendors in the Student Center include sites run by EMU's Dining Services, Smashburger and Starbucks. Past vendors include Taco Bell, KFC, Sbarro, Panda Express, Wendy's and Subway. In recent years EMU has moved away from chain restaurants to sites run and owned by the university.

The facility is also heavily used for local and state conferences. In addition, due to the building's design the facility has hosted several "green" environmental conferences in the facility. Beyond this due to the school's aviation program, the school has hosted several aviation conferences.

== Kiva Room ==
The Student Center also includes the Kiva Room, a round, 360-degree room patterned after spaces used in Native American cultures, on the north end of the third floor. The Kiva Room is used as a meeting space, for collaboration, or for musical purposes.
