= Murder of Jeanne Clery =

1986 murder in Pennsylvania, United States

Jeanne Clery
- Born: November 23, 1966; Philadelphia, Pennsylvania, U.S.
- Died: April 5, 1986 (aged 19); Bethlehem, Pennsylvania, U.S.
- Parent(s): Connie and Howard Clery

The murder of Jeanne Clery occurred at Lehigh University in Bethlehem, Pennsylvania, on April 5, 1986. Clery, who was a freshman at the time of her death, was raped and killed in her dormitory on the Lehigh University campus. Clery's parents believed the university failed to share vital information with its students regarding campus safety, and launched a campaign for legislative reform for several years following their daughter's death.

In 1988, Josoph Henry, another Lehigh University student, was convicted of murdering and raping Clery and was sentenced to death, but he later agreed to drop all appeals in exchange for life imprisonment without parole.

The efforts of Clery's parents led to the 1990 passage of the Clery Act, a U.S. federal law requiring all universities and colleges that participate in federal student financial aid programs to report crime statistics, alert their respective campuses of imminent dangers, and distribute an Annual Campus Security Report to current and prospective students and employees, or face fines for failing to comply with the act.

== Assault, murder, and aftermath ==
On April 5, 1986, in the spring of her freshman year, Jeanne Clery was raped and murdered in Stoughton Hall at Lehigh University by Josoph M. Henry, a fellow Lehigh University student. Clery was awakened by Henry while he was in the process of burglarizing her room. He then beat, kicked, cut, raped, sodomized, bit and strangled her. Prior to Clery's death, there were 181 reports of auto-locking doors being propped open on the campus. Henry is believed to have gained access to Clery's room through the propped doors, which was left unlocked in anticipation of the return of her roommate.

Henry confessed the murder to friends and was subsequently reported to the police and apprehended. He was later sentenced to death via the electric chair, a decision upheld by the Supreme Court of Pennsylvania upon appeal.

Witness testimony at the trial quoted Henry as explaining after the murder that "he hates whites" and also dismissed his crime as "nothing".

The judge in his sentencing emphasized the extreme cruelty of the prolonged torture, rape and murder of the victim.

In 2002, after his death sentence was thrown out, Henry opted to give up further appeal rights in exchange for accepting life in prison. He is currently serving his sentence at State Correctional Institution – Dallas in Jackson Township, Pennsylvania.

=== Campaign by the Clerys ===
As Clery's parents, Connie and Howard, learned more about their daughter's death, they became convinced that her murder was the result of "slipshod" security on the Lehigh University campus. Beyond this, they believed the university had "a rapidly escalating crime rate, which they didn't tell anybody about.” At the time, Lehigh University's vice president, John Smeaton, said that security measures were "more than adequate, reasonable and appropriate for our setting and our situation. You can't prevent everything from happening." The Clery family believed that campus crime statistics had been significantly underreported, and they sued Lehigh University on the basis that 37 violent crimes had occurred in the three years prior to Jeanne's murder, which would have dissuaded her from attending had the university published crime records; they were awarded $2 million (equivalent to $6 million in 2023). They also founded the nonprofit organization Security On Campus, Inc., later renamed the Clery Center for Security On Campus.

== Clery Act ==
=== Enactment ===
The Jeanne Clery Disclosure of Campus Security Policy and Campus Crime Statistics Act or 'Clery Act' is a federal statute codified at 20 U.S.C. § 1092(f), implementing regulations in the U.S. Code of Federal Regulations at 34 CFR 668.46. The Clery Act, signed in 1990, was originally known as the Crime Awareness and Campus Security Act.

=== Requirements ===
The Clery Act requires all colleges and universities that participate in federal financial aid programs to keep and disclose information about crime on and near their respective campuses. Compliance is monitored by the United States Department of Education, which can impose civil penalties, up to $69,733 per violation in 2024, against institutions for each infraction and can suspend institutions from participating in federal student financial aid programs.

Each year, institutions must publish and distribute their Annual Campus Security Report to current and prospective students and employees. This report is required to provide crime statistics for the prior three years, policy statements regarding various safety and security measures, campus crime prevention program descriptions, and procedures to be followed in the investigation and prosecution of alleged sex offenses.

Beyond this, universities are required to provide a crime log, timely warnings to students, and crime statistics. The institution's police department or security departments are required to maintain a public log of all crimes reported to them, or those of which they are made aware. The Clery Act requires institutions to give timely warnings of crimes that represent a threat to the safety of students or employees. Institutions are required to report on crimes such as: murder, rape, dating violence, robbery, and hate crimes, as well as any disciplinary actions by the institution.

=== Violations ===
Since its founding, at least three universities have been found in violation of the Clery Act: Eastern Michigan University in Ypsilanti, Michigan related to the murder of Laura Dickinson in 2006; Pennsylvania State University in Penn State University Park related to the Penn State child sex abuse scandal between 1994 and 2004; and Virginia Tech in Blacksburg, Virginia, related to the Virginia Tech shooting in 2007.

== See also ==
- Crime mapping
- Disappearance of Suzanne Lyall, SUNY Albany sophomore whose parents worked to name state and federal laws after her
- Duty to warn
- Family Educational Rights and Privacy Act
- Murder of Yeardley Love, University of Virginia lacrosse player killed by an ex-boyfriend on campus
