= Ewing v. Goldstein =

- Court: California Court of Appeals
- Full case name: Cal Ewing et al., Plaintiffs and Appellants, v. David Goldstein, Ph.D., Defendant and Respondent.
- Decided: July 16, 2004
- Citations: 120 Cal. App. 4th 807; 15 Cal Rptr. 3d 864 (Cal. Ct. App. 2004)

Court membership
- Judges sitting: Paul Boland, Candace D. Cooper, Laurence D. Rubin

Case opinions
- Decision by: Boland
- Concurrence: Cooper, Rubin

Keywords
- Duty to protect; Duty to warn

Ewing v. Goldstein 15 Cal. Rptr. 3d 864 (Cal. Ct. App. 2004) is a landmark court case that extended California mental health professional's duty to protect identifiable victims of potentially violent persons, as established by Tarasoff v. Regents of the University of California, to include acting upon communications from third parties that indicate a possible threat.

== Facts ==
In the "Factual and Procedural Background" section of its ruling, the appellate court found the following facts:

Between 1997 and 2001, former police officer Gene Colello received treatment from David Goldstein. One of reasons for seeking treatment was the depression that Colello was experiencing after breaking up with his girlfriend and learning that she had become involved with Keith Ewing. In June 2001, Colello told his father that he was "considering causing harm" to Ewing. Colello's father relayed this statement to Goldstein. Goldstein encouraged Colello's voluntary hospitalization, which was done. When learning that Colello was going to be discharged from the hospital the next day, Goldstein urged the hospital psychiatrist to reconsider that decision. The hospital discharged Colello and, one day later, he murdered Ewing and then committed suicide.

Ewing's parents brought suit against Goldstein (as well as Collello's parents and the hospital psychiatrist) alleging professional negligence for failing to warn either Ewing or law-enforcement agencies about the "risk of harm his patient posed to their son's safety".

== Ruling ==
The court ruled that the case should be heard by the lower court. They determined that the duty to protect was not sufficiently discharged by initiating involuntary commitment and could be discharged only by warning the identifiable victims.

== Implications ==
This case created a clear distinction between the duty to protect and the subordinate duty to warn and made communications by a third party indicating threatening statements equivalent to statements made directly by that person.
