= S v Russell =

South African legal case

- Court: Natal Provincial Division
- Full case name: S v Russell
- Decided: 12 July 1967
- Citation: 1967 (3) SA 739 (N)

Court membership
- Judges sitting: Fannin J and Van Heerden J

Case opinions
- Decision by: Van Heerden J

Keywords
- Criminal law, Culpable homicide, Omission, Negligence

In S v Russell, an important case in South African criminal law, heard on July 12, 1967, the accused had been warned of the danger of operating a crane under a live electric wire, but had failed to pass on the warning to his co-employees. This omission, constituting negligence, led to the death of one of them. He was convicted of culpable homicide.

== Facts ==
Russell, the accused, was charged before a magistrate of culpable homicide arising out of the electrocution of Aaron Masenyetsi, a black male employee at Ngagane Railway Station. It appeared from the evidence that on June 23, 1966, the accused, a white male carpenter employed in the Department of Water Affairs, was assisting one Mostert, the crane operator in charge of loading pipes onto a lorry from a crane fitted on the back thereof, also an employee of the Department.

Overhead was an electric wire. Whilst Mostert and his black assistants, including the deceased, were not present, the shunter, in accordance with his duty to warn all workmen present, had informed the accused that the current was about to be switched on, and that he would be advised when it was switched off, so that they could proceed with the loading. The deceased omitted to inform Mostert thereof on his return, and the loading continued.

The top of the crane touched the wire and the deceased was electrocuted and died.

== Judgment ==
In a review of a conviction of culpable homicide, Van Heerden J cited Silva's Fishing Corporation (Pty.) Ltd v Maweza, where Steyn CJ, who delivered the minority judgment, after referring to certain remarks made by Innes ACJ and Wessels JA, in Halliwell v Johannesburg Municipal Council, stated as follows:

From these remarks it may fairly be gathered that an omission does not entail delictual liability where there is no legal duty to act, that generally speaking such a duty will arise from a prior act or from prior conduct, but that it could also arise from some other source, one such possible source being a statute. If the true sense of those judgments is a more restricted one, viz. that an omission unconnected with prior conduct is always to be regarded as a mere omission, i.e. as a failure to do what the person concerned is not bound to do, I must, with great deference, disagree with it. The Roman law, as also the Roman-Dutch law, recognises the principle that, generally speaking, no one is bound to mind the business of another, even where he can, with no danger or expense to himself, avert serious harm from the other, and that no liability is incurred by refraining from doing so, even if the omission should violate a moral duty [....] But there is a variety of circumstances, some of them unconnected with prior conduct, which impose the duty to act in order to avoid reasonably foreseeable loss to another. The circumstances which will give rise to such a duty may differ according to the conceptions prevailing in a particular community at a given time.

In Rex v Meiring, Innes CJ had stated as follows:

Now negligence can never be disentangled from the facts; but its existence is best ascertained by applying to the facts of each case the standard of conduct which the law requires. And that standard is the degree of care and skill which a reasonable man would exercise under the circumstances.

In Cape Town Municipality v Paine, Innes CJ added the following:

It has repeatedly been laid down in this Court [the Appellate Division] that accountability for unintentioned injury depends upon culpa—the failure to observe that degree of care which a reasonable man would have observed. I use the term reasonable man to denote the diligens paterfamilias of Roman law—the average prudent person. Every man has a right not to be injured in his person or property by the negligence of another—and that involves a duty on each to exercise due and reasonable care. The question whether in any given situation a reasonable man could have foreseen the likelihood of harm and governed his conduct accordingly is one to be decided in each case upon a consideration of all the circumstances. Once it is clear that the danger would have been foreseen and guarded against by the diligens paterfamilias, the duty to take care is established, and it only remains to ascertain whether it has been discharged.

Van Heerden J found, on the basis of these and other authorities, that the accused in casu, by the manner of his acceptance of the warning in Mostert's absence, had created a potentially dangerous position, and that thereafter there was a duty on him to pass on the warning to Mostert and his co-employees who were engaged on the same project, and who might reasonably be unaware of the danger; and that his failure to do so constituted negligence. It was the accused's negligence, accordingly, which had caused the death of the deceased: "It accordingly follows, in my opinion, that the conviction and sentence were in accordance with justice and that they should both be confirmed by this Court."

== See also ==
- South African criminal law
