= Clery Act =

1990 US federal law

Jeanne Clery Campus Safety Act (formerly the Jeanne Clery Disclosure of Campus Security Policy and Campus Crime Statistics Act)
- Long title: Jeanne Clery Campus Safety Act
- Nicknames: Clery Act
- Enacted by: the 101st United States Congress

Citations
- Public law: Pub. L. 101–542

Codification
- Acts amended: Higher Education Act of 1965
- Titles amended: 20
- U.S.C. sections amended: 20 U.S.C. § 1092, et al

Legislative history
- Introduced in the Senate as the Student Athlete Right-to-Know Act (S. 580) by Bill Bradley (D-NJ) on March 15, 1989; Committee consideration by Senate Labor; Passed the Senate on February 22, 1990 (voice vote); Passed the House as the Student Right-to-Know and Campus Security Act on June 5, 1990 (without objection); Reported by the joint conference committee on October 16, 1990; agreed to by the House on October 22, 1990 (voice vote) and by the Senate on October 24, 1990 (voice vote); Signed into law by President George H. W. Bush on November 8, 1990

Major amendments
- Pub. L. 102–26; Pub. L. 102–325; Pub. L. 105–244 (text) (PDF); Pub. L. 106–386 (text) (PDF); Pub. L. 113–4 (text) (PDF); Pub. L. 118–173 (text) (PDF)

The Jeanne Clery Campus Safety Act (formerly the Jeanne Clery Disclosure of Campus Security Policy and Campus Crime Statistics Act), signed in 1990, is a federal statute codified at 20 U.S.C. § 1092(f), with implementing regulations in the U.S. Code of Federal Regulations at 34 CFR 668.46.

The Clery Act requires all colleges and universities that participate in federal financial aid programs to keep and disclose information about crime on and near their respective campuses. Compliance is monitored by the United States Department of Education, which can impose civil penalties, up to $69,733 per violation, against institutions for each infraction and can suspend institutions from participating in federal student financial aid programs.

The law is named after Jeanne Clery, a 19-year-old Lehigh University student who was raped and murdered in her campus residence hall in 1986. Her murder triggered a backlash against unreported crime on campuses across the country.

== Jeanne Clery ==
Josoph M. Henry, a student, raped and murdered Jeanne Clery in April 1986 in Stoughton Hall at Lehigh University in Bethlehem, Pennsylvania. Henry was given a death sentence via the electric chair by a trial court, a decision upheld by the Pennsylvania Supreme Court when appealed. The attack on Clery was one of 38 violent crimes recorded at the university in three years. Clery's parents argued that, had the university's crime record been known, Clery would not have attended. They sued, were awarded $2 million, and founded Security On Campus, Inc. (now the Clery Center), a nonprofit group.

== Requirements of act ==
=== Annual security report ===
By October 1 of each year, institutions must publish and distribute their Annual Campus Security Report to current and prospective students and employees. Institutions are also allowed to provide notice of the report, a URL if available, and instructions on how to obtain a paper copy. This report is required to provide crime statistics for the prior three years, policy statements regarding various safety and security measures, campus crime prevention program descriptions, and procedures to be followed in the investigation and prosecution of alleged sex offenses.

=== Crime log ===
Each institution's police department or security departments are required to maintain a public log of all crimes reported to them or those of which they are made aware. The log is required to have the most recent 60 days' worth of information. Each log entry must contain the nature, date, time and general location of each crime and disposition of the complaint, if known. Information in the log older than 60 days must be made available within two business days. Crime logs must be kept for seven years, three years after the publication of the last annual security report.

=== Timely warnings ===
The Clery Act requires institutions to give timely warnings of crimes that represent a threat to the safety of students or employees. Institutions are required to publish their policies regarding timely warnings in their Annual Campus Security Report. Institutions are required to notify the community only of crimes covered by the Clery statistics.

=== Crime statistics ===
As of 2025, an institution must keep the most recent seven years of crime statistics that occurred: on campus, in institution residential facilities, in noncampus buildings, or on public property. Offenses are defined by the UCR Handbook and are not the state crime definitions but rather federal crime definitions. This has led to possible discrepancies in data reporting. Some changes have been made to further define discrepancies in recent updates to the Clery Act. In 2014, new amendments were made to require reporting on domestic violence, dating violence and stalking. In cases of forcible sexual offenses, there have been reports of colleges questioning accounts of alleged victims, further complicating documentation and policing of student assaults.

Institutions are required to report on crimes such as:

- Murder (including nonnegligent and negligent manslaughter)
- Sex offenses (forcible/nonforcible, domestic violence, dating violence, and stalking)
- Robbery
- Aggravated assault
- Burglary
- Motor vehicle theft
- Arson
- Arrest

Institutions are required to report on persons referred for campus disciplinary action for:

- Liquor law violations
- Drug-related violations
- Weapons possession

Institutions are required to report on crimes or bodily harm related to/caused by:

- Hate crimes

== Notable incidents ==
Numerous institutions have been fined and found in non-compliance of the Clery Act. Many include defining of crimes, reporting methods and alerting students of dangers. From 2008–2012, 14 higher education institutions were fined for Clery Act noncompliance. Large scale Clery violations have resulted in financial fines at institutions such as Pennsylvania State University, Eastern Michigan University, Virginia Tech, University of Montana, and Liberty University.

Reports on complaints of Clery Act noncompliance are available from the Federal Student Aid (FSA) website. Federal Student Aid, an office of the Department of Education, conducts reviews to evaluate compliance with the Clery Act.

According to the Federal Student Aid (FSA) page on Clery Act Reports, "The Jeanne Clery Disclosure of Campus Security Policy and Campus Crime Statistics Act is a federal statute requiring colleges and universities participating in federal financial aid programs to maintain and disclose campus crime statistics and security information. The U.S. Department of Education conducts reviews to evaluate an institution's compliance with the Clery Act requirements....Once a review is completed, the Department issues a Final Program Review Determination. Although regular program reviews may contain Clery Act findings, this page includes only those program reviews that were focused exclusively on the Clery Act. Below, you can access these reports as well as accompanying documentation which may include the complaint, school response, or fine action that resulted from the program review."

=== Eastern Michigan University ===
In 2008, Eastern Michigan University was fined $357,500 for failing to warn the campus of a student's assault and death that occurred in 2006. Beyond reporting the incident, the school was fined for violating federal crime-reporting laws. The Laura Dickinson incident has been seen as a wake-up call on how universities report and display statistics on crimes that occur on university campuses. The incident brought forth university-wide changes in campus safety and safety notifications. The incident also brought changes in university administration, including the dismissal of the university's president, John A. Fallon.

=== Michigan State University ===
On September 5, 2019, the U.S. Department of Education announced that Michigan State University would be fined $4.5 million, the largest ever Clery Act penalty, up until the Liberty University penalty in March of 2024, following an investigation into the institution's response to allegations of misconduct by Larry Nassar.

=== Penn State University ===
The U.S. Department of Education is investigating Penn State over the Penn State sex abuse scandal. Their investigation arises from the university administration's alleged failure to report allegations of sex offenses on campus by Jerry Sandusky, a former school official, as being a violation of the Act. Former Penn State Defensive Coach Jerry Sandusky has been convicted of sexually abusing several young boys over several years, including incidents on campus. A campus safety advocacy group called the scandal "the most extensive investigation the Department of Education has ever conducted".

On November 3, 2016, The U.S. Department of Education announced that it is seeking to impose on Penn State University, a record fine at the time of nearly $2.4 million for 11 cited violations.

=== Virginia Tech ===
After the Virginia Tech massacre of April 2007, the U.S. Department of Education's final report (December 2010) concluded Virginia Tech violated this Act. Additionally, the Department of Education fined the University $55,000 in March 2011 for "failure to issue a timely warning" in response to the shootings at West Ambler Johnston. The university appealed the fine, arguing that actions were in compliance with guidelines distributed to schools by the Department of Education. In March 2012 the U.S. Department of Education's administrative law judge ruled in favor of the university, stating: "This was not an unreasonable amount of time in which to issue a warning. …. if the later shootings at Norris Hall had not occurred, it is doubtful that the timing of the email would have been perceived as too late."

=== University of California, Berkeley ===
On September 17, 2019 the US Department of Education issued a Final Program Review Determination following an analysis of UC Berkeley's policies, procedures and statistics from 2009–2016 that found UC Berkeley to have failed to comply with the Clery Act. On September 9, 2020, UC Berkeley and federal authorities reached a settlement agreement under which the campus will pay $2.35 million to the Department of Education and remain under a two-year monitoring agreement.

According to UC Berkeley's "SUMMARY of Department of Education Findings," the infractions committed are as follows:

- The vast majority of UC Berkeley's misclassifications of incidents (982 of the 1,125 total misclassifications or approximately 87 percent) were improperly classified student disciplinary referrals.
- The Department of Education found that the campus lacked the administrative capability to administer the Clery Act. Many of the findings are technical and administrative in nature and relate to the classification of crimes, compliance with Daily Crime Log requirements, compilation and disclosure of various crime statistics and the failure to issue the Annual Security and Fire Safety Report each year under the exacting standards required.
- The department also concluded that the university failed to follow its sexual violence and sexual harassment policies with regard to simultaneous notification of a disciplinary outcome to a single complainant, failed to issue Emergency Notifications appropriately in an SVSH matter in 2013 and a campus protest in 2017, failed to issue Timely Warnings and maintain appropriate documentation.

=== University of Montana ===
In 2018, the Department of Education cited the University of Montana "for inaccurate and misleading crime statistics for calendar years 2012 through 2015," resulting in a nearly $1 million fine which the university is appealing.

=== Liberty University ===
In March of 2024, the Department of Education issued a record-high fine of $14 million for 11 violations, including "failing to maintain an accurate, daily crime log; failing to issue timely warnings to the campus community about reportable crimes; and failing to comply with numerous sexual violence prevention and response requirements." In a public statement, Liberty announced $2 million in campus funds that will be put toward safety improvements.

== See also ==
- Crime mapping
- Duty to warn
- Family Educational Rights and Privacy Act (FERPA)
- Murder of Yeardley Love
