= Dr. Lauren Pinter-Brown v. Regents of the University of California =

Dr. Lauren Pinter-Brown v. Regents of the University of California, Superior Court of California, County of Los Angeles, Case No. BC624838, was a case in which the jury awarded a $13 million verdict against the University of California in a sex discrimination and retaliation case.

The jury found that UCLA discriminated against Pinter-Brown based on her gender and retaliated against her. The $13 million verdict was delivered in Judge Michael Linfield's courtroom on February 15, 2018, after approximately 14 days of trial. The jury found that Pinter-Brown deserved $3 million in lost earnings and $10 million in damages for emotional distress.

Dr. Lauren Pinter-Brown started working at UCLA's medical center as the director of its lymphoma program in 2005. She received excellent peer reviews and awards throughout her tenure. Pinter-Brown began raising concerns about being harassed by a male colleague but was subsequently targeted in audits. She later had her research privileges suspended and her title damaged.

According to court documents, UCLA made no significant efforts to fix the problem filing verbal and written complaints. Pinter-Brown was forced to "play dead" at work to avoid additional conflicts. She eventually resigned from her position in 2015.

At trial, UCLA argued that Pinter-Brown mischaracterized the harassment, and contended the alleged conduct were her not getting along with the alleged harasser. UCLA further asserted that it properly handled her reports of harassment through the internal grievance process.

The California Court of Appeal's Second Appellate District reversed the lower court's decision in April 2020.

On May 9, 2024, at the retrial of the same case, Pinter-Brown won a $14 million verdict.

== See also ==
- University of California v. Katherine Rosen
- Janet Conney v. The Regents of the University of California
