= Jablonski by Pahls v. United States =

- Court: United States Court of Appeals for the Ninth Circuit
- Full case name: Meghan Corinne Jablonski, a minor, by her Guardian ad Litem, Isobel C. Pahls v. United States of America
- Argued: December 6, 1982
- Decided: June 14, 1983
- Citation: 712 F.2d 391 (9th Cir. 1983)

Case history
- Subsequent history: Amended Aug. 8, 1983

Court membership
- Judges sitting: Eugene Allen Wright, J. Clifford Wallace, Anthony Kennedy

Case opinions
- Majority: Wallace, joined by Wright, Kennedy

Jablonski by Pahls v. United States, 712 F.2d 391 (9th Cir. 1983) is a landmark case in which the 9th Circuit Court of Appeals determined that a mental health professional's duty to predict dangerousness includes consulting a patient's prior records, and that their duty to protect includes the involuntary commitment of a dangerous individual; simply warning the foreseeable victim is insufficient.

== Facts ==
Phillip Jablonski was dating Melinda Kimball and had threatened to kill her and her mother (Isobel Pahls). After one incident that culminated in a threat towards her mother, she took him to the Loma Linda VA Hospital, where the doctor conducted a risk assessment, but did not consult his prior records, which documented a history of violent behavior. Based on this incomplete data, he determined erroneously that Jablonski was not a danger to himself or others and released him. He warned Kimball to leave Jablonski but did not warn her of his potential for violence. When Jablonski was discharged from the hospital, he killed Kimball.

== Ruling ==
The court ruled that the doctor's failure to secure the patient's previous records constituted negligence, as the information in his files would have affected the risk assessment and thus the actions taken to protect the foreseeable victim.

== See also ==
- Tarasoff v. Regents of the University of California
