= Regents of University of California v. Superior Court of Los Angeles County (Rosen) =

2018 California Supreme Court case

Regents of the Univ. of Cal. v. Superior Court (Rosen)
- Supreme Court of California

Argued January 3, 2018 Decided March 22, 2018
- Full case name: The Regents of the University of California, et al., Petitioners, v. The Superior Court of Los Angeles County, Respondent; Katherine Rosen, Real Party in Interest.
- Citation(s): 4 Cal.5th 607 (2018); 230 Cal. Rptr. 3d 415; 413 P.3d 656

Holding
- A university has a special relationship with its students, and thus has a duty to protect them from foreseeable violence in classroom or curricular settings.

Court membership
- Chief Justice: Tani Cantil-Sakauye
- Associate Justices: Carol Corrigan, Goodwin Liu, Mariano-Florentino Cuéllar, Leondra Kruger, James A. Richman (Note: Associate Justice of the First District of the California Court of Appeals, filling vacant seat.)

Case opinions
- Majority: Corrigan, joined by Cantil-Sakauye, Liu, Cuéllar, Kruger, Richman
- Concurrence: Chin

Regents of the University of California v. Superior Court of Los Angeles County, 4 Cal. 5th 607, 413 P.3d 656 (2018), was a case in which the Supreme Court of California held that universities owe a duty to protect students from foreseeable violence during curricular activities. In an opinion by Justice Carol Corrigan, the Court reinstated the 2010 case in which Katherine Rosen, a former UCLA student, sued the university for negligence when another student stabbed her in a chemistry lab. Following this ruling, Rosen can continue to pursue the case in court.

== Prior history ==
Rosen's action alleged that the university breached its duty of care by failing to adopt reasonable measures that would have protected her from another student's violent on-campus attack. The Court of Appeal, Second Appellate District, Division Seven initially held that a public university had no general duty to protect its students from criminal acts of other students, thus the university's summary judgment motion was wrongly denied by the superior court.

== See also ==
- Janet Conney v. The Regents of the University of California
- Tarasoff v. Regents of the University of California
