= Sherzer Hall =

- U.S. Historic district – Contributing property
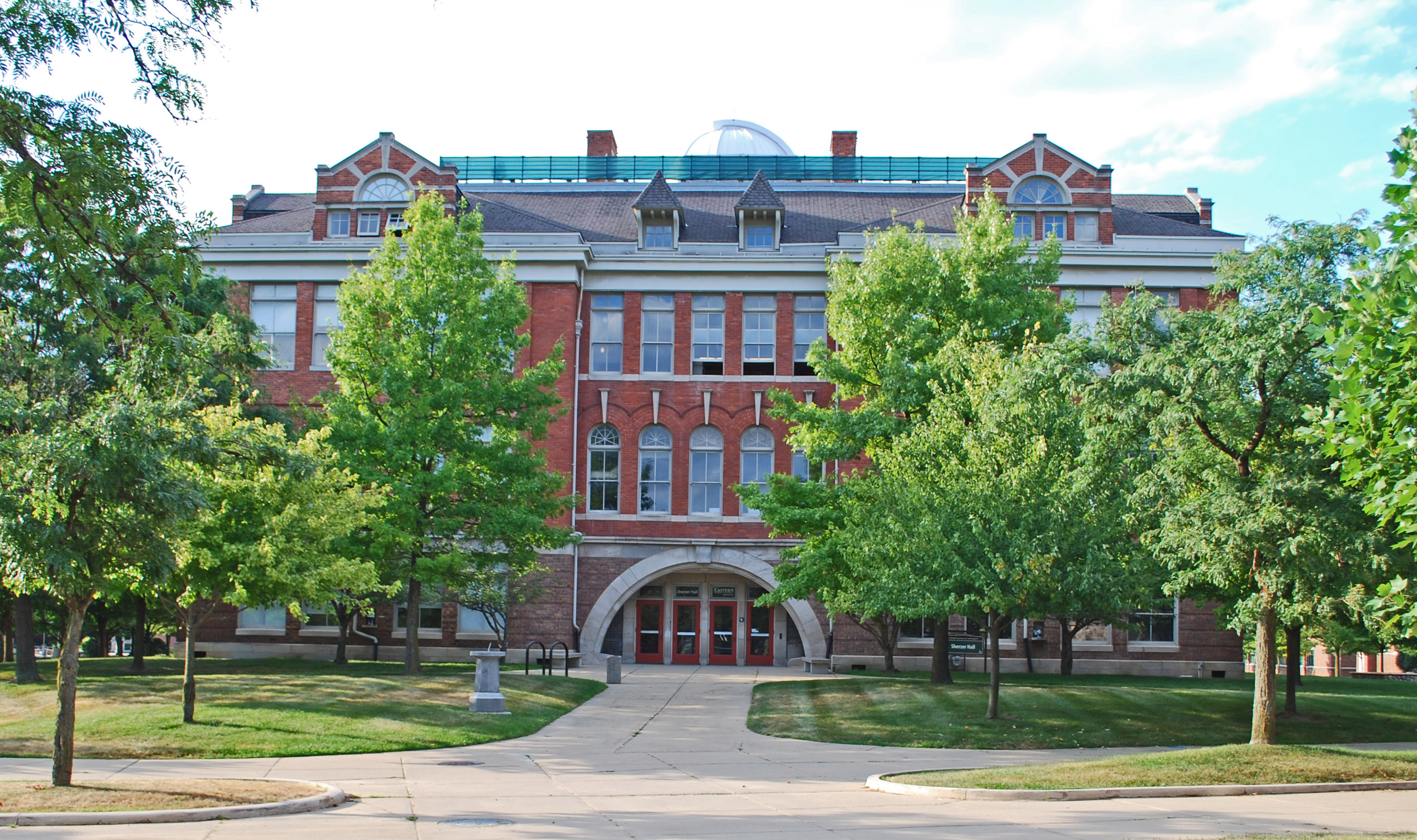
- Sherzer Hall south side
- Location: Ypsilanti, Michigan
- Built: 1903
- Architect: E. W. Arnold
- Architectural style: Romanesque, Georgian
- Part of: Eastern Michigan University Historic District (ID84000017)
- Added to NRHP: 1984

Sherzer Hall is an academic building on the Eastern Michigan University campus, located in Ypsilanti, Michigan. Sherzer Hall is one of four buildings comprising the Eastern Michigan University Historic District on the National Register of Historic Places. The building was designed by E. W.. Arnold of Battle Creek and survived two fires.

== History ==
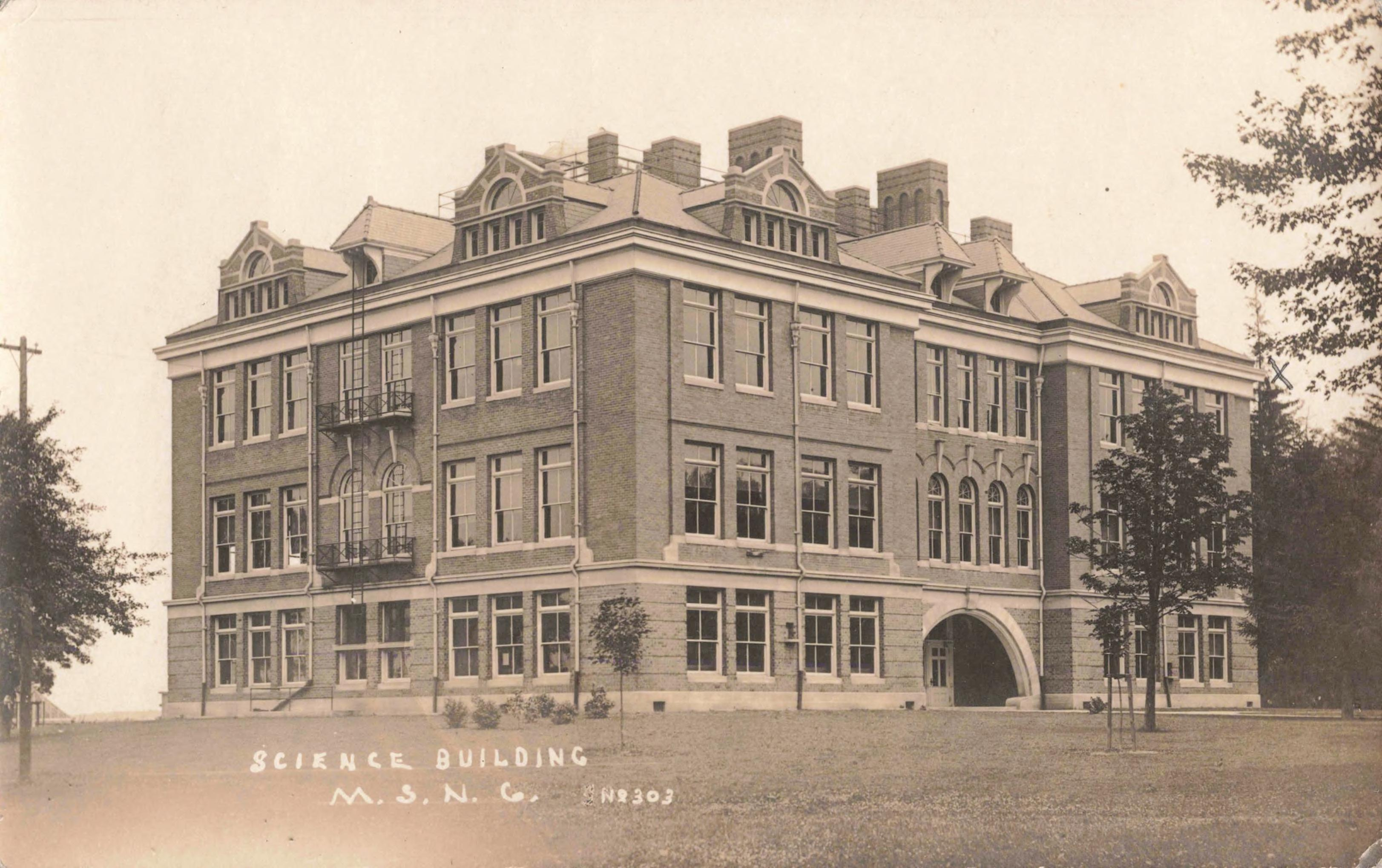
1907 postcard of the building

Sherzer's exterior has a few mildly Romanesque and Georgian elements. Due to its unique style causes it to defies stylistic classification. Sherzer also is home to Sherzer Observatory which was established in 1878 and eventually moved to the top of Sherzer Hall in 1903.

Sherzer Hall has a red-brick exterior. Sherzer's exterior has a few mildly Romanesque and Georgian elements. Its unique style defies stylistic classification. The building is named after Dr. William H. Sherzer, professor of geology and head of Department of Natural Sciences who served from 1892 to 1932. The building was built during the presidency of Dr. Lewis Henry Jones at the time the school was called Michigan Normal College as the school.

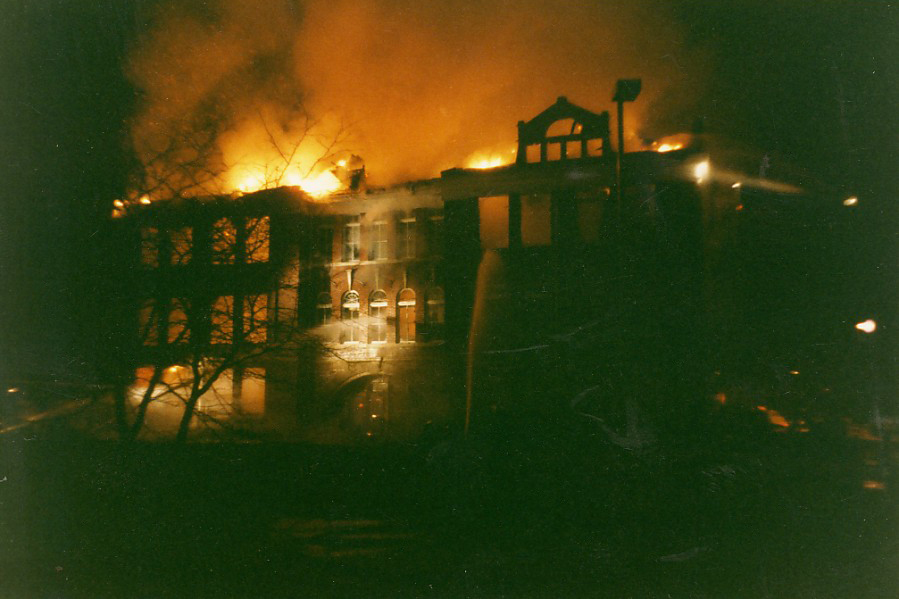
Sherzer Hall fire in 1989

The building survived two fires. In 1973 a small fire caused $10,000 of damage, all of which was completely restored. On March 9, 1989, however, the building burned almost to the ground. 50% of the exterior and 70% of the interior was destroyed. The building was entirely rebuilt in 18 months. Quinn Evans Architects and Eastern Michigan University received recognition for the reproduction of the original masonry techniques. Recognition was received from the Masonry Institute in 1992. Built for $55,000 in 1903, the building was rebuilt 87 years later for 5.5 million.

Today the building is home to the EMU Art Department. Built originally for science purposes the building maintains ties to its scientific heritage though its rooftop observatory. In December 1997 a new radio telescope was installed on the roof to collect radio waves created by celestial objects.

== Sherzer Observatory ==
Sherzer Observatory was established in 1878 with a gift from the citizens of Ypsilanti. The Observatory housed a 4-inch (100 mm), $600 Alvan Clark refractor. The original observatory was located on Pierce Hall was hit by a tornado and destroyed in 1893. It was then relocated to the roof of the new Natural Science Building in 1903. The building and observatory was later named after William Sherzer, a science professor at the school who conceived the design for the new building after seeing similar facilities on a visit to Germany.
