= Eastern Michigan University Department of Special Education =

University department

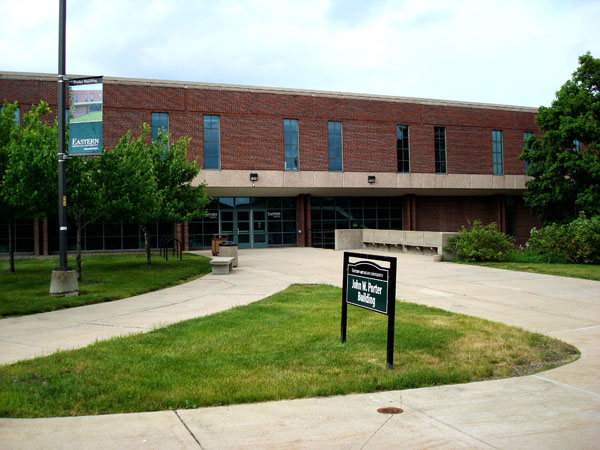
Porter Hall home to the Eastern Michigan University College of Education and EMU department of Special Education

The Eastern Michigan University Department of Special Education is among the oldest special education programs in the United States. The Department of Special Education falls under the Eastern Michigan University College of Education at Eastern Michigan University in Ypsilanti, Michigan. The Eastern Michigan University Department of Special Education provides extensive studies for those wanting to participate in the disabled community. There are currently five programs or courses of study one may choose to follow, if they wish to obtain a bachelor's degree and a recommendation to the Michigan Department of Education K–12 endorsement as a teacher of students with impairments.

== History ==
Eastern Michigan University Department of Special Education is among the oldest special education program in the United States. In 1923, the Michigan State Legislature passed bills that gave school districts state funds if they included and established special schools for disabled students: those of cognitive impairment, those of the deaf, those who were physically disabled or those who were visually impaired. Though the receiving state funds seemed incising, the new bills also included that the educators of these new special schools must be specifically trained for their work. The Michigan Board of Education came to the realization that such teachers were of dire need in the state. They then established an official department at the Michigan State Normal College (previous name of Eastern Michigan University until 1956). This was the beginning of Eastern Michigan's Department of Education. By 1928, Michigan State Normal College provided classes for teachers training to be educators of the deaf and "hard of hearing" (now referred to as hearing impaired), for the "crippled" (now referred to as physical and other health impairments) and for the "mentally retarded" (now cognitively impaired). In 1929, a class for children with "defective vision" (now visually impaired) was established. Though the department was made official in 1923, the very first education course in the program was in the summer of 1915 when Dr. Charles Scott Berry took his work from the Feeble-minded school of Lapeer to Michigan State Normal College. Dr. Berry had taken charge of the school until the summer of 1917, where Professor Charles Elliott claimed his spot. The first laboratory class for teachers of disabled people was made possible in 1918, having Miss Blanche Towne as the training teacher. Since then, all of the work set forth by Dr. Berry has been for training teachers for children with various impairments.

== Original courses ==
The first courses that Michigan State Normal College started for the Department of Special Education were in the summer of 1915. The courses that were offered are as follows: 1. Mental deficiency 2. Psychology of backward and mentally deficient children 3. Methods of training backward and mentally deficient children 4. Demonstration special class 5. Health inspection 6. Mechanics of exercise 7. Speech defects 8. Basketry, weaving, and mat work.

== Current majors ==
Eastern Michigan University's Department of Special Education currently offers six majors that fulfill five endorsements of teaching. There is a Cognitive Impairment major, and Emotional Impairment major, a Hearing Impairment major, a Speech/Language Pathology major, a Teacher of Students with Physical and other Health Impairment major, and a visual Impairment major. The CI (Cognitive Impaired) major qualifies one for a recommendation to the Michigan Department of Education for K–12 endorsement as a Teacher of Students with Cognitive Impairment. This particular program requires 151 hours worth of credits, which includes general education credit requirements from the university. The EI (Emotional Impairment) also qualifies one for a recommendation to the Michigan Department of Education for K–12 endorsement as a Teacher of Students with Emotional Impairments. This program requires 136 hours worth of credits. HI, the Hearing Impairment program, qualifies one for a recommendation to the Michigan department of Education for K–12 endorsement as a Teacher of Students with Hearing Impairment. Eastern Michigan University has been an approved center for training teachers of the hearing impaired since 1967. VI, the Visual Impairment program, qualifies one for a recommendation to the Michigan department of Education for K–12 endorsement as a Teacher of Students with Visual Impairment. The Speech/Language Pathology Major offered by the Department of Special Education of Eastern Michigan University is one a program that finishes with the completion of a master's degree. The bachelor's degree itself does not qualify the recommendation to the Michigan Department of Education.

== Department residence ==
The Department of Education originally resided in Pierce Hall on the campus of Eastern Michigan University, but there was very little space for the department there. In 1937, Professor Elliott received $280,000 from the Horace H. and Mary A. Rackham Foundation to construct a building that was specifically made for the training of teachers with various types of disabilities. This was the first building in the United States that had these kind of accommodates for disabled children. In 1999, the Department of Special Education joined the Department of Teacher Education into the John W. Porter Building.

== Articles referencing EMU's special education program ==
In 2008, Dee and Brehm William $1 million gift to the Department of Special Education at Eastern Michigan University. In 2003, the Eastern Michigan faculty newspaper referred to the department's audition to online courses for autism endorsements.
