= Eastern Michigan University =

Public university in Ypsilanti, Michigan, US

- Former names: Michigan State Normal School (1849–1899); Michigan State Normal College (1899–1956); Eastern Michigan College (1956–1959)
- Motto: "Equity, Exemplar, Excellence"
- Type: Public research university
- Established: 1849; 177 years ago
- Accreditation: HLC
- Academic affiliations: Space-grant
- Endowment: $94.01 million (2022)
- President: Brendan Kelly, Ph.D.
- Provost: Rhonda Longworth
- Faculty: 972 (2025/26)
- Administrative staff: 886 (2024/25)
- Students: 12,176 (fall 2024)
- Undergraduates: 10,034 (fall 2024)
- Postgraduates: 2,142 (fall 2024)
- Location: Ypsilanti, Michigan, United States; 42°15′01″N 83°37′28″W
- Campus: 800 acres (3 km^{2}); Large Suburb
- Newspaper: The Eastern Echo
- Colors: Green and white
- Nickname: Eagles
- Sporting affiliations: NCAA Division I FBS – MAC; CAA
- Mascot: Swoop
- Website: www.emich.edu

Eastern Michigan University is a public research university in Ypsilanti, Michigan, United States. Founded in 1849 as the Michigan State Normal School, it was the fourth normal school (teachers' college) established in the United States and the first outside New England. In 1899, the Michigan State Normal School became the first normal school in the nation to offer a four-year curriculum; the college became a university in 1959.

EMU is one of the eight research universities in the state of Michigan and is classified among "R2: Doctoral Universities – High research activity." It is governed by an eight-member board of regents whose members are appointed by the governor of Michigan and confirmed by the Michigan Senate for eight-year terms.

The university comprises eight colleges and schools: College of Arts and Sciences, College of Business, College of Education, College of Health and Human Services, GameAbove College of Engineering and Technology, School of Music & Dance, the Honors College, and the Graduate School. The university is composed of an academic and athletic campus spread across 800 acres (3.2 km^{2}), with over 120 buildings. As of 2023, EMU's total enrollment is over 13,000 students. EMU has experienced a steady yearly decrease in total fall enrollment; in the fall of 1990, total enrollment was 25,954 students.

In 1991, Eastern Michigan's athletic teams started competing as the Eastern Michigan Eagles and the school mascot, Swoop, was officially adopted by the university three years later in 1994. The Eagles compete in the NCAA Division I Mid-American Conference. EMU Athletics utilizes Rynearson Stadium for its football games, Oestrike Stadium for its baseball games, and the multipurpose George Gervin GameAbove Center for its basketball games.

== History ==
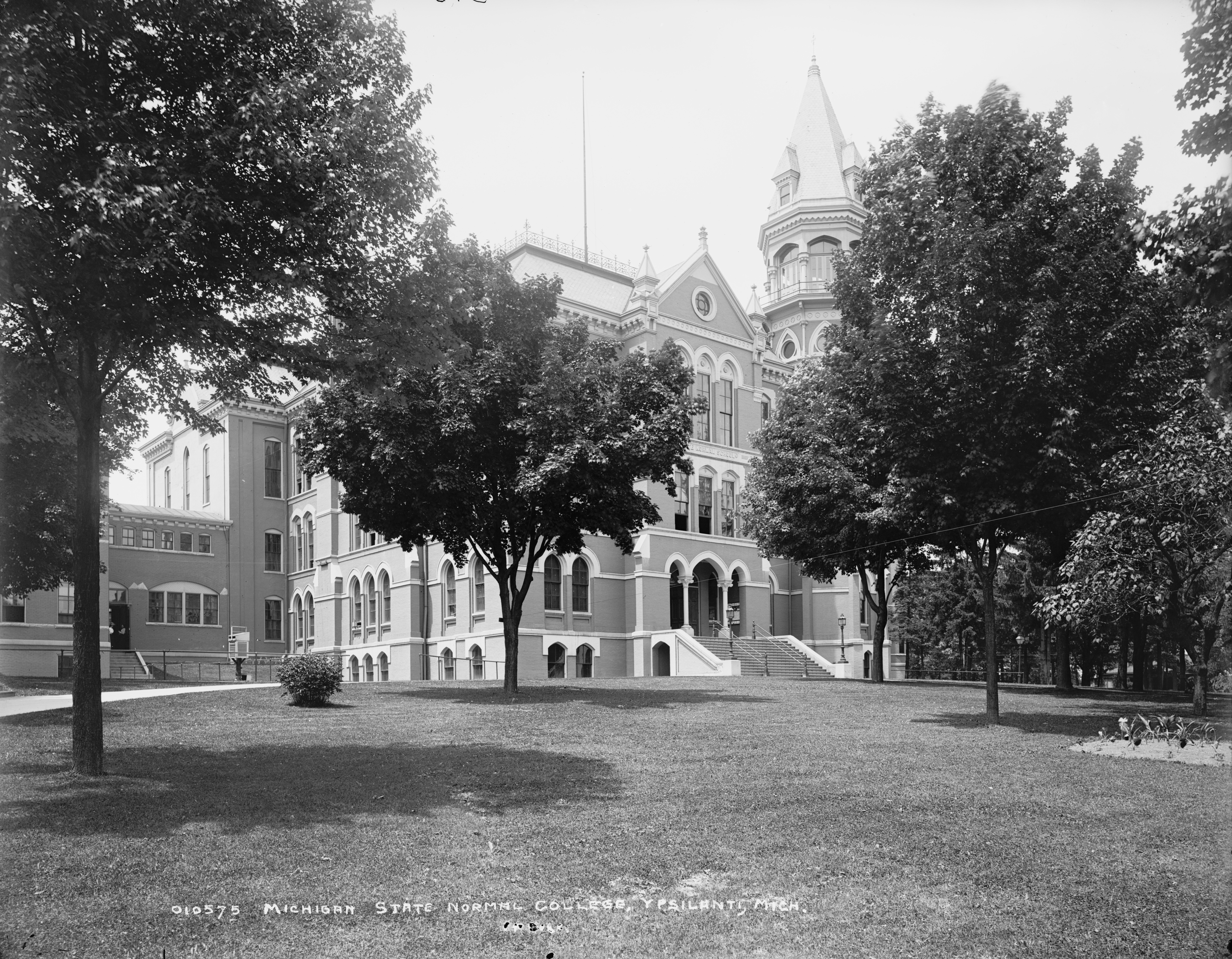
The Old Main Building was completed in 1852, a year before the Normal School opened its doors. It was destroyed in a fire in 1859 and rebuilt in 1860.

Influenced by similar academies in Europe, the Michigan Legislature founded the Michigan State Normal School in 1849 with its campus in Ypsilanti. There was a significant contest among municipalities across Michigan to become the home of the state's first normal school. These other contending villages and towns included Niles, Jackson, and Marshall. The school officially opened its doors for classes on March 29, 1853, with 122 enrolled students. American normal schools were intended to be institutions to improve the quality of the burgeoning common school system by producing qualified teachers.

Adonijah Welch, a University of Michigan graduate, served as the Normal School's first principal. He later became the first president of Iowa State Agricultural College, now Iowa State University. The university's Georgian Revival-style Welch Hall bears his name. Constructed in 1895, Welch Hall is the second-oldest surviving building on the university's campus and an Eastern Michigan University Historic District contributing property.

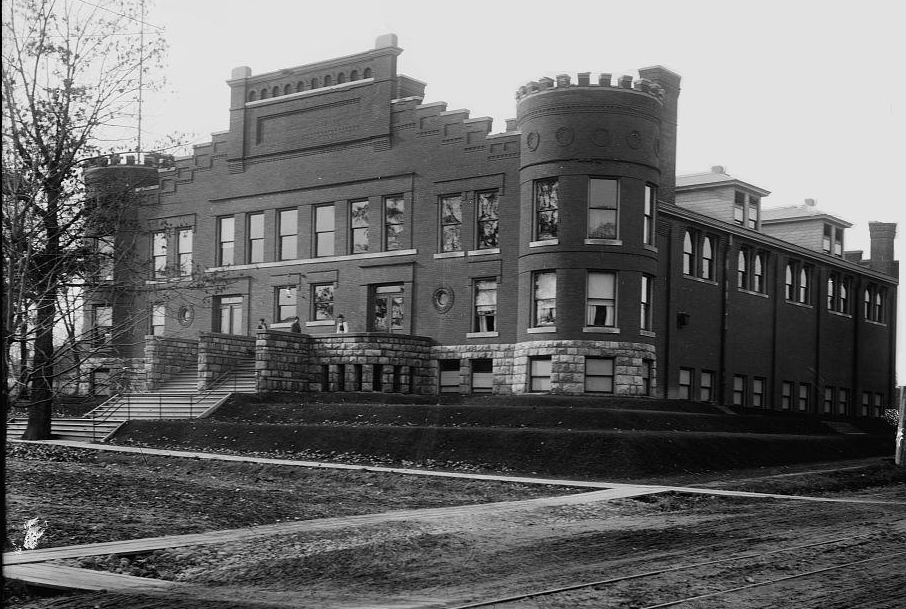
The Old Gymnasium on the Michigan State Normal School campus. It was constructed in 1894 and demolished in 1965.

In 1899, the school became the Michigan State Normal College when it developed the first four-year curriculum for a normal school in the nation. The Normal College began the twentieth-century as Michigan's premier teacher-preparatory school. The school continued through World War I, the Great Depression, and World War II, and continued to expand further. In 1956, under President Eugene Elliott, the school officially became Eastern Michigan College. This was mostly due to the expansion of the school's programs and increased enrollment following the Second World War.

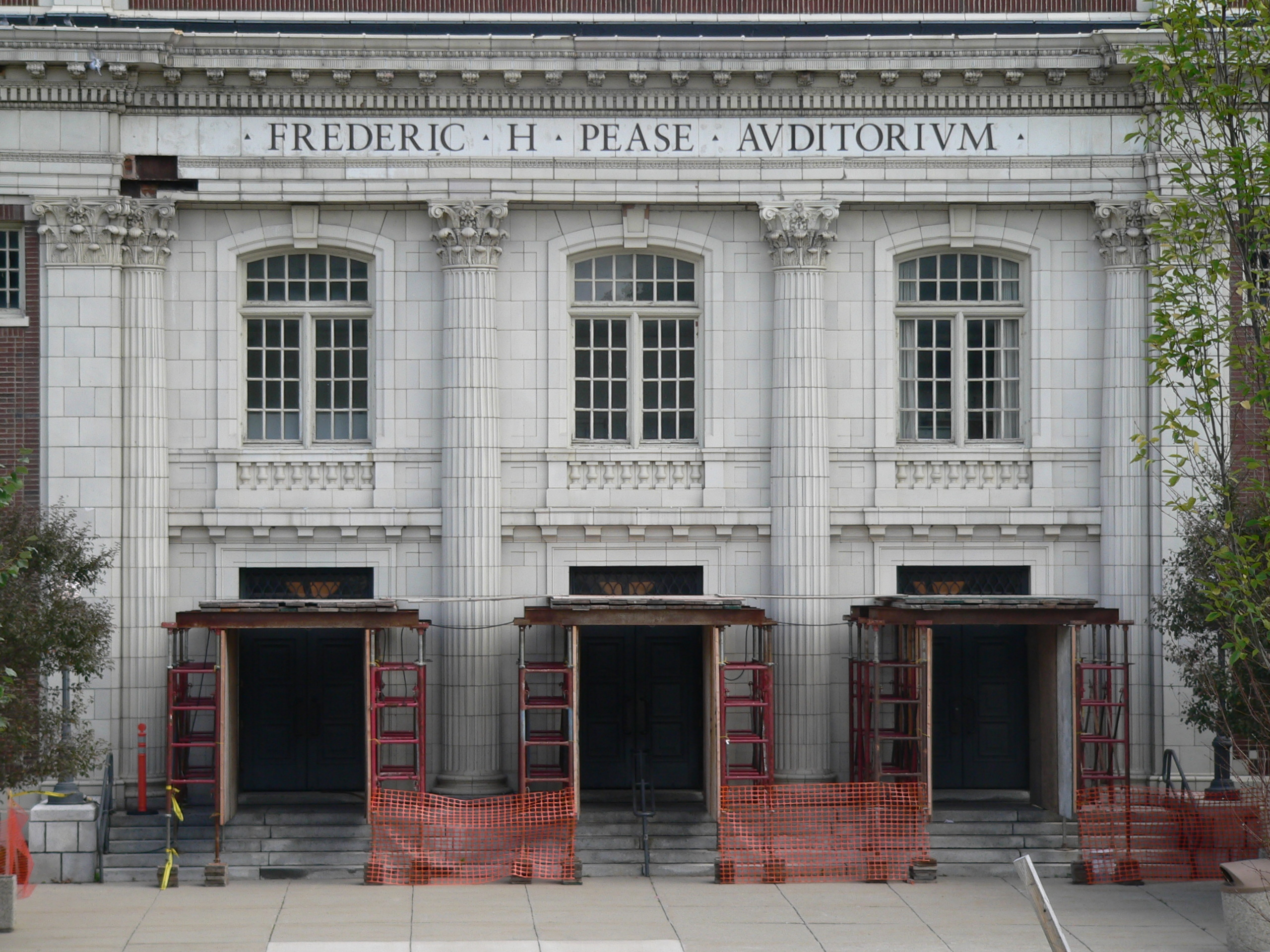
Frederic Henry Pease Auditorium under renovation.

In 1959 the school became a university, gaining the title Eastern Michigan University after establishing the Graduate School (graduate classes had been offered for two decades, since 1939). Between 1959 and 1980 the College of Education, College of Arts and Sciences, the Graduate School, College of Business, College of Health and Human Services, and College of Technology (now GameAbove College of Engineering and Technology) were formally organized and established. In the early 1970s, international student exchange schemes were organized, including one with Coventry College of Education (later part of the University of Warwick) in Britain. In 2005, the Honors Program officially became the Eastern Michigan University Honors College.

More recently, extended programs were added, such as Continuing Education (which includes EMU Online), the Centers for Corporate Training, the World College, and numerous community-focused institutes. Most programs are undergraduate or master's level, although the university has doctoral programs in Educational Leadership, Technology, and Psychology.

Prior to Michigan's 1963 State Constitution, Eastern Michigan University was governed by Michigan's elected State Board of Education. Since the ratification of the 1963 constitution, EMU has been governed by an eight-member Board of Regents. These regents are appointed by the Governor of Michigan with the advice and consent of the Michigan Senate, and serve eight-year terms. The regents, in turn, elect the president of the university.

=== Laura Dickinson murder ===
On December 15, 2006, EMU student Laura Dickinson's body was found in her dorm room at Hill Hall. EMU issued a statement the next day that foul play was not suspected, but EMU student Orange Amir Taylor III was arrested February 23, 2007 and charged with her rape and murder. Many Eastern Michigan students were especially skeptical of their university's compliance with the law because of this delay. According to police reports, the investigation was regarded as a homicide; however, this was denied and only officially announced on the day of Taylor's arrest. His arrest happened to be the first day students could not withdraw from classes and housing for a full refund. A subsequent investigation by Detroit law firm Butzel Long found that EMU had violated the Clery Act by not notifying students and named Vice President of Student Affairs, Jim Vick, as the main source of the cover-up.

The nationally reported scandal resulted in the firing of President John A. Fallon by the Board of Regents. He was notified of the unanimous vote of the Board to fire him by a letter sent to his home on July 15, 2007. At a special meeting called by the Board of Regents on Monday, July 16, 2007, the separation of President John Fallon was officially announced along with the separation of Jim Vick, Vice President for Student Affairs and Cindy Hall, Director of Public Safety and Chief of Police. A letter of discipline was placed in University Counsel Kenneth McKanders' file. It was also announced that Donald Loppnow, Provost and Vice President for Academic Affairs, would be appointed Executive Vice President and in this role serve as Acting President until an Interim President is selected.

The Department of Education report relating to the Clery Act violations has been released to the public. It states, "Several findings of noncompliance were discovered during the review which the Department [of Education] considers to be serious violations of the Clery Act." The result of this report has yet to be seen. EMU released the executive summary of its response to the DOE report on July 27, 2007. In June 2008, the university announced that it had agreed to pay a fine of $350,000 for the violations of the Clery Act.

On December 13, 2007, EMU settled with the family and estate of Laura Dickinson for $2.5 million.

On April 7, 2008, a jury convicted Orange Taylor III of first-degree murder, assault with intent to commit sexual penetration, home invasion, and theft charges. He was sentenced to life imprisonment on May 7, 2008.

== Campus ==
- Eastern Michigan University Historic District
- U.S. National Register of Historic Places
- U.S. Historic district
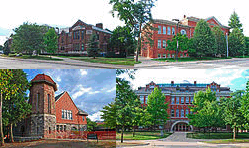
- Location: Ypsilanti, Michigan
- Area: 8 acres (3 ha)
- Built: 1931
- Architect: Ernest W. Arnold, Frank Eurich Jr., Malcomson and Higginbotham
- Architectural style: Colonial Revival, Art Deco
- NRHP reference No.: 84000017
- Added to NRHP: October 4, 1984

Eastern Michigan University's main campus is located in Ypsilanti, Michigan, comprising 122 buildings and spanning 800 acres (3.2 km^{2}).

=== Satellite campuses ===
EMU offers courses at 7 satellite campuses. The earliest off-site campus is EMU-Jackson. Courses have been offered in Jackson, Michigan since the 1970s. Course catalog records show courses have been offered at the Kresge Environmental Center dating back to at least 1976. EMU has held courses in Flint and Traverse City since 1987. EMU–Livonia began offering courses in 2000. In 2001, EMU–Detroit opened. EMU opened its Monroe location in 2002. The last off-campus site, EMU–Brighton, opened in 2003. EMU and Grand Valley State University offers a joint doctoral program in Educational Leadership at the Eberhard Center in Grand Rapids, Michigan. The Eberhard Center facility is part of the GVSU downtown campus. This location is sometimes referred to as EMU–Grand Rapids but is not officially listed as a university site.

- EMU–Brighton – Brighton, Michigan
- EMU–Detroit – Detroit
- EMU–Jackson – Jackson, Michigan
- EMU–Monroe – Monroe, Michigan
- EMU–Northern Michigan – Traverse City, Michigan
- Kresge Environmental Center – Lapeer, Michigan

== Academics ==
=== Undergraduate admissions ===
Undergraduate admissions statistics
- 2025 entering class
- Admit rate: 77.7% (▲ +2.5)
- Yield rate: 9.3% (▼ −6.7)

Test scores middle 50%^{[i]}
- SAT Total: 920–1160 (▼ −45 median)
- SAT EBRW: 480-605 (▼ −10 median)
- SAT Math: 440-570 (▼ −40 median)
- ACT Composite: 18–25 (▼ −0.5 median)

High school GPA^{[ii]}
- Top 10%: 12% (▼ −4)
- Top 25%: 38% (▼ −1)
- Top 50%: 69% (▼ −4)
- Average: 3.39 (▼ −0.02)

EMU is considered "selective" by U.S. News & World Report. For the Class of 2029 (enrolled fall 2025), EMU received 18,548 applications and accepted 14,416 (77.7%). Of those accepted,1,338 enrolled, a yield rate (the percentage of accepted students who choose to attend the university) of 9.3%. EMU's freshman retention rate is 72%, with 46% going on to graduate within six years.

For fall 2025, EMU received 2,803 applications for transfer admission and accepted 2,204, an admission rate of 78.6%. Of those accepted, 1,013 enrolled, a yield rate of 46.0%. A transfer applicant must have a minimum of 12 credits completed and maintain a 2.0 overall grade point average (or better).

The enrolled first-year class of 2029 had the following standardized test scores: the middle 50% range (25th–75th percentiles) of SAT scores was 920–1160, with EBRW and Math scores being 480-605 and 440-570, respectively, while the middle 50% range of ACT scores was 18–25. The average GPA of the incoming freshman class was 3.39, with 12% of the class being in the top 10%, 38% in the top 25%, and 69% in the top 50% of the high school class.

Fall first-time freshman statistics
	2025	2024	2023	2022	2021
Applicants	18,548	21,337	20,351	19,919	17,506
Admits	14,416	16,992	16,555	16,578	14,811
Admit rate	77.7	79.6	81.3	83.2	84.6
Enrolled	1,338	1,650	1,898	891	2,312
Yield rate	9.3	9.7	11.5	5.3	15.6
ACT composite* (out of 36)	18-25 (5%^{†})	18-27 (5%^{†})	18–26 (6%^{†})	18–25 (6%^{†})	18–25 (8%^{†})
SAT composite* (out of 1600)	920-1160 (48%^{†})	930-1150 (71%^{†})	910–1150 (71%^{†})	930–1170 (68%^{†})	950–1180 (55%^{†})
* middle 50% range^{†} percentage of first-time freshmen who chose to submit

Fall transfer students statistics
	2025	2024	2023	2022	2021	2020
Applicants	2,803	2,533	2,256	2,331	2,875	3,620
Admits	2,204	1,703	1,603	1,670	2,129	2,395
Admit rate	78.6	67.2	71.1	71.6	74.1	66.2
Enrolled	1,013	886	814	861	1,139	1,312
Yield rate	46.0	52.0	50.8	51.6	53.5	54.8

=== Academic divisions ===
Academic rankings

National
- Forbes: 623
- U.S. News & World Report: 373 (tie)
- Washington Monthly: 202
- WSJ/College Pulse: >600

College/school	Founded
College of Arts and Sciences	1959
College of Education	1959
Graduate School	1959
College of Business	1964
College of Health and Human Services	1975
GameAbove College of Engineering and Technology	1980
Honors College	2005

Eastern Michigan University offers degrees and programs at the bachelor's, master's, specialist's and doctoral levels. There are more than 200 majors and minors at the undergraduate level, and more than 170 graduate programs. EMU has six Academic Divisions and eight University Sites which include satellite campuses. Just like many other large universities EMU does offer online courses and degrees.

The university has seven colleges and schools: College of Arts and Sciences, College of Business, College of Education, College of Health and Human Services, GameAbove College of Engineering and Technology, the Honors College, and the Graduate School. Eastern Michigan University has offered graduate courses since 1939. The Graduate School has over 2,000 graduate students enrolled in post-baccalaureate, certificate, master's, and doctoral programs.

The two oldest colleges at the university are the College of Education and the College of Arts and Sciences (CAS). The College of Arts and Sciences is also the largest academic college at Eastern Michigan University with 125 programs of study. The CAS also occupies the most buildings on campus including Pray-Harrold, Sherzer Hall, the Kresge Environmental Education Center, the Terrestrial and Aquatic Ecology Research Facility, and Pease Auditorium. Eastern Michigan University has had a long history of developing educators since its founding in 1849. EMU prides itself as being one of the largest producers of educational personnel in the country since 1991. Eastern Michigan University's Department of Special Education is also among the oldest special education program in the United States, being started in 1923.

The College of Business (COB) was established in 1964. In 1991, a new College of Business campus was constructed in Downtown Ypsilanti on Michigan Avenue with the hope of contributing to the redevelopment of the area. In 2020, EMU announced its decision to move the COB back to its Main Campus. The COB's current home is Boone Hall, located next to Cross Street in South Campus. The College of Business is known for having the first Ethos Week and Ethos Honor Society in the country.

Eastern Michigan University established the College of Human Services in 1975. Eventually the university changed the name to the College of Health and Human Services on April 21, 1982.

The most recent college of the university is the Honors College founded in 2005. Its predecessor program, the EMU Honors Program, was founded in 1984.

Its most popular undergraduate majors, by 2023 graduates, were:

Registered Nursing/Registered Nurse (335)
Psychology (151)
Multi-/Interdisciplinary Studies (126)
Social Work (110)
Computer Science (84)
Marketing/Marketing Management (83)
Speech Communication and Rhetoric (83)
Biology/Biological Sciences (80)
Accounting (74)
Business Administration and Management (74)

=== Library ===
The Bruce T. Halle Library, opening to students in 1998, houses a collection of more than 1,000,000 items that includes extensive reference, periodical, and circulating materials such as books, microform, microfilm, sound recordings, and other items to aid students in their course work and research. It is named after Bruce Halle, founder of Discount Tire and a graduate of the Michigan State Normal College. Previously, Eastern Michigan University's library had been located in Ford Hall and then the Porter Building (now home to the Eastern Michigan University College of Education).

== Student life ==
Student body composition as of October 15, 2024
Race and ethnicity	Total
White	55%
Black	17%
Other (Note: Other consists of Multiracial Americans & those who prefer to not say.)	10%
Hispanic	10%
Asian	3%
Foreign national	5%
Economic diversity
Low-income (Note: The percentage of students who received an income-based federal Pell grant intended for low-income students.)	39%
Affluent (Note: The percentage of students who are a part of the American middle class at the bare minimum.)	61%

Just like many large universities EMU has many student oriented facilities outside the classroom. The university has plays, musicals, student organizations, and various social activities for students. On-campus hangouts include the Student Center, The Rec/IM, Halle Library, and dining facilities like the Eastern Eateries and the Commons (DC1). EMU's office of Campus Life provides many co-curricular opportunities for both resident students and commuter students which include Friday night movies, Laugh Lounge and Sky Lounge. In addition to activities on campus, EMU's campus life office also organizes occasional "Eastern Excursions" to cities such as Detroit, Cleveland, and Chicago. Off-campus hangouts include Depot Town, Frog Island, Riverside Park, downtown Ann Arbor and The Ugly Mug coffee shop.

=== Student organizations ===
Student Organizations at Eastern are housed under Campus Life. Most academic departments on campus have at least one student organization for students who are interested in that subject area. Students work with volunteer organizations such as Habitat for Humanity both during the school year and on breaks. Other clubs include the Muslim Student Association, Eastern Michigan Smash Club (EMUSC) and the LGBTA (Lesbian, Gay, Bisexual, Transgender/Transsexual Association). Eastern Michigan University has over 340 student clubs and organizations.

EMU offers a variety of Greek organizations on campus. The Greek system provides fraternities and sororities students can join, many of which have houses within walking distance of campus. Just like most universities EMU has a National Pan-Hellenic Council, College Panhellenic Council and Interfraternity Council Interfraternity Council comprises eight fraternities, and the Panhellenic Council is made up of nine sororities. National Pan-Hellenic Council consists of 9 historically African-American fraternities and sororities, five fraternities and four sororities.

Alpha Sigma Tau, a national Panhellenic sorority was founded at EMU on November 4, 1899. Sigma Nu Phi, a local sorority, was founded on Eastern's campus September 30, 1897. It is the oldest Greek organization on campus as well as the oldest continually-functioning local sorority in the nation. Greek Life at EMU hosts a yearly event called Greek Week. Greek Week is a week of events centered on Greek unity and spirit. The week often occurs in the beginning of April. Other traditions include Greek Awards. The yearly awards are based on the university's Greek Standards and Assessment Program (GSAP).

=== Campus media and publications ===
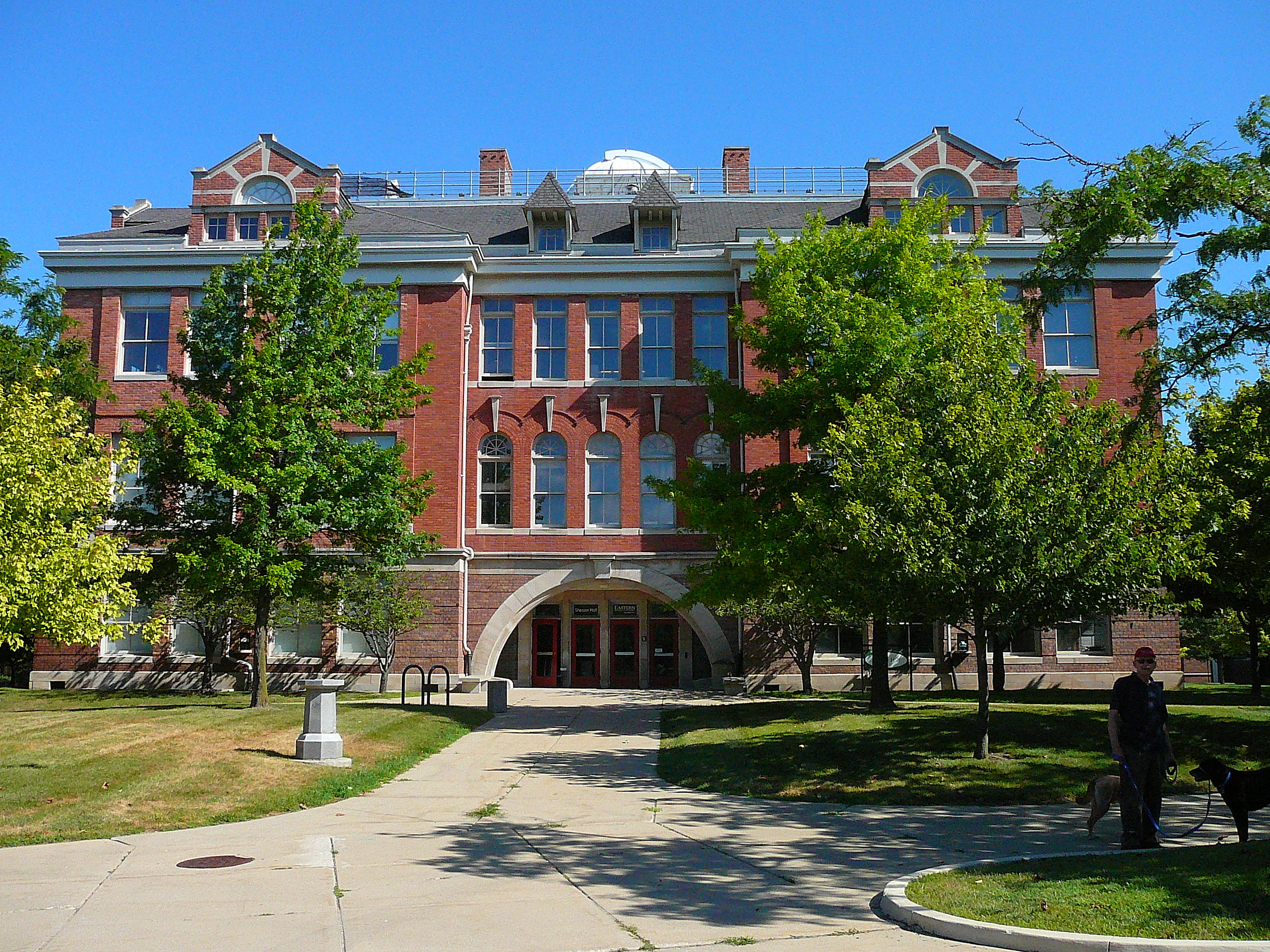
Sherzer Hall

The Eastern Echo, EMU's independent student newspaper, is published three times a week during the fall and winter semesters and once a week during the spring semester, as well as publishing content online. The paper won eight awards in the 2005 Division 1 Michigan Collegiate Press Association contest, including second place in the general excellence category. The newspaper, which is funded through advertising revenue and university funds, is not under the editorial control of the university.

Also part of the EMU Student Media Office is Cellar Roots, the school's student-run literary and fine arts magazine. Cellar Roots celebrated its 35th anniversary in 2006 with a week of events that highlighted the history of the publication. Cellar Roots is a five-time winner of the National Pacemaker award for design, an award often equated with the Pulitzer Prize for the college level, as well numerous other awards.

EMU hosts two radio stations WQBR and WEMU 89.1 FM. WEMU is a National Public Radio member station. The radio station, which features jazz music, has many student employees and broadcasts many EMU athletic games. WQBR stands for Quirk Building Radio, where the station was once hosted in Quirk. Today WQBR is named Eagle Radio and is no longer hosted in Quirk. Eagle Radio broadcasts from Halle library and is an Internet only radio station at www.eagleradio.org.

The LINGUIST List is a major online resource for the academic field of linguistics. It was founded by Anthony Aristar in early 1990 at the University of Western Australia, and is used as a reference by the National Science Foundation in the United States. Its main and oldest feature is the premoderated electronic mailing list, now with thousands of subscribers all over the world, where queries and their summarized results, discussions, journal table of contents, dissertation abstracts, calls for papers, book and conference announcements, software notices and other useful pieces of linguistic information are posted.

=== Traditions ===
Eastern Michigan has several campus-wide traditions throughout the school year. Longstanding traditions include Homecoming, Martin Luther King Jr. Week and the use of the Pray-Harrold Kiosk by students.

The Pray-Harrold Kiosk (or Pillar) is a large cement pillar outside the Pray-Harrold Building and the Rec/IM. The Pillar is painted by various organizations for campus awareness, advertisements and organization unity. The legend is that it started as a flagpole and layers of paint have accumulated over the years.

During Eastern's fall semester, traditions include EagleFest, Community Plunge, and Homecoming. EagleFest occurs during the school's orientation and welcoming weekend in September. The event brings more than 300 campus offices, and student organizations together in University Park & Bowen Field House to showcase campus organizations and services. Community Plunge also occurs during orientation and offers the opportunity for students, staff and faculty to participate in service in the Ypsilanti community.

During Eastern's winter semester campus traditions include: Ethos Week; The Gold Medallion Awards; Relay For Life; and Martin Luther King Jr. Week, held in conjunction with the Martin Luther King Jr. Day holiday, with speakers, community building events and awards in celebration of King and his dream. Ethos Week is a week-long annual event occurring in March and is led by the COB. The event promotes business ethics and ethics education. The Gold Medallions Awards are split into two ceremonies. The Gold Medallion Awards started in 1982 and is organized by Eastern's Student Affairs Division to recognize faculty, students and staff. In 1996, the Student Gold Medallion Awards were established. The award ceremony recognizes student leaders, student organizations, divisional programs, activities or service. Eastern's Relay For Life event is a 24-hour, yearly event held in University Park that started in 1985. The event is centered on supporting the American Cancer Society. The event brings in campus organizations from the entire campus. The event has been held at various times during the year but in recent times the event is held in early April before the school-year ends.

=== Residence halls and apartments ===
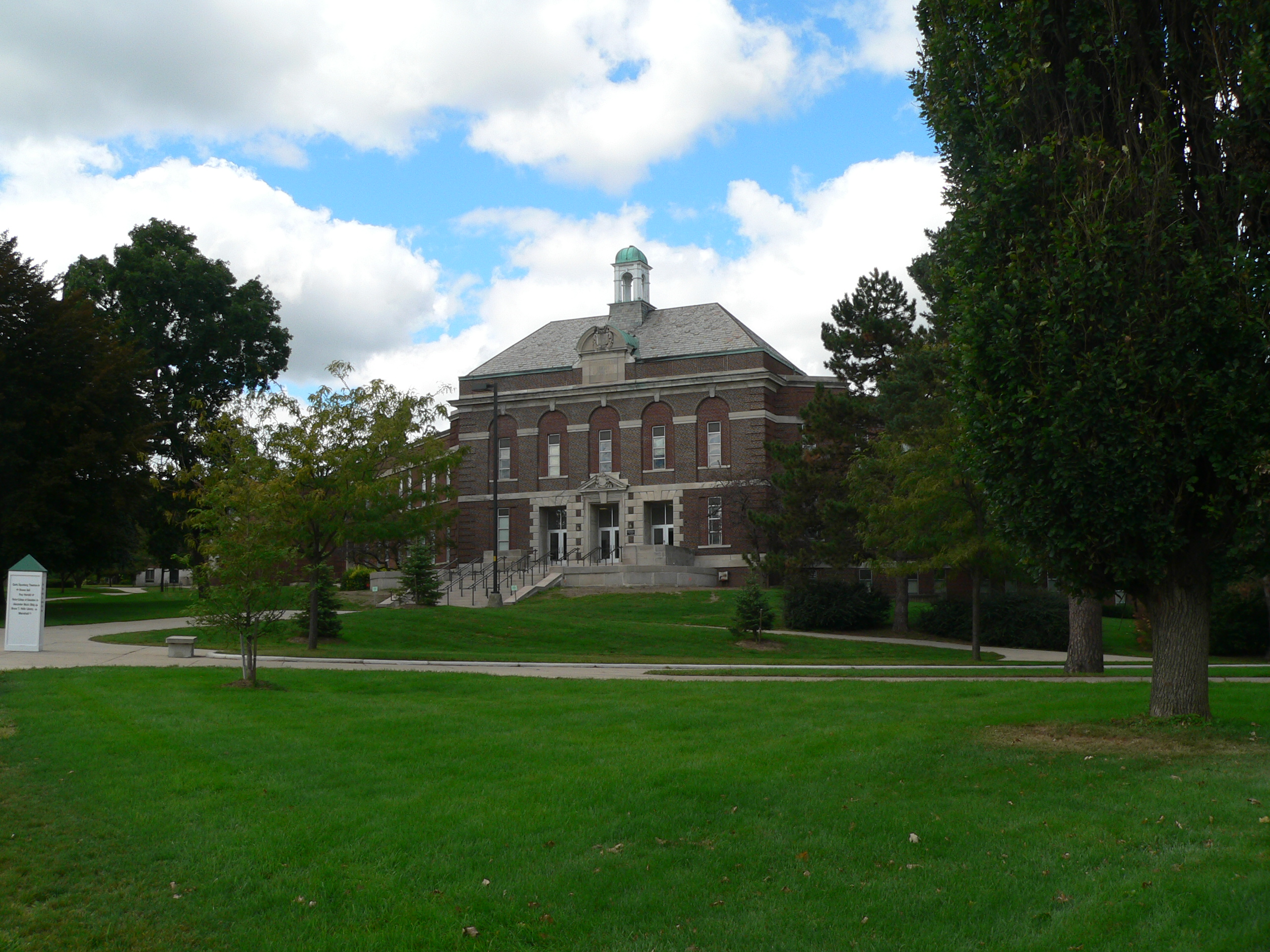
Roosevelt Hall

Eastern Michigan University has 14 residence halls. As of Fall 2014 first-year only residence halls will include Putnam and Phelps. Upperclassmen student living options include: the Village, Buell, and the three apartment complexes. Sellers, Wise, Walton, Downing, Wise, Hill, Hoyt, Pittman and Best house all students, regardless of class ranking. Honors students are housed in Downing and Best Halls. Past locations included Jones and Goddard Halls. Eastern also offers faculty, staff and family housing options in Cornell Courts, and Westview apartments.

According to the university, approximately 5,000 students live on campus. In the fall of 2010, EMU began housing some full-time students in the Village Complex from Washtenaw Community College, which is less than half a mile away, however the program ended in 2011 when housing enrollment went up.

In 2011, Eastern Michigan became the first university in Michigan and the eighth nationwide to offer a targeted program to house single parents with their children on campus. Called "Keys to Degrees", the program will house single-parent families near each other in one of Eastern Michigan's on-campus apartment complexes, and will offer extra academic and personal support to enrollees.

Dining services at EMU are operated by Chartwells Higher Education. Facilities include one buffet-style dining hall, two à la carte dining halls, the Student Center food court, and convenience stores across campus.

In June 2022, Eastern Michigan finalized plans to invest $200 million into a long-term renovation and addition to the campus' residence halls, including the renovation of all existing residence halls and the construction of two new residence halls.

=== Safety ===
EMU former-President Susan W. Martin, Ph.D., took office as EMU's twenty-second president on July 7, 2008, just after the university was fined a then-record $350,000 for not reporting to students the sexual assault and murder of a student in her residence hall room.

== Athletics ==
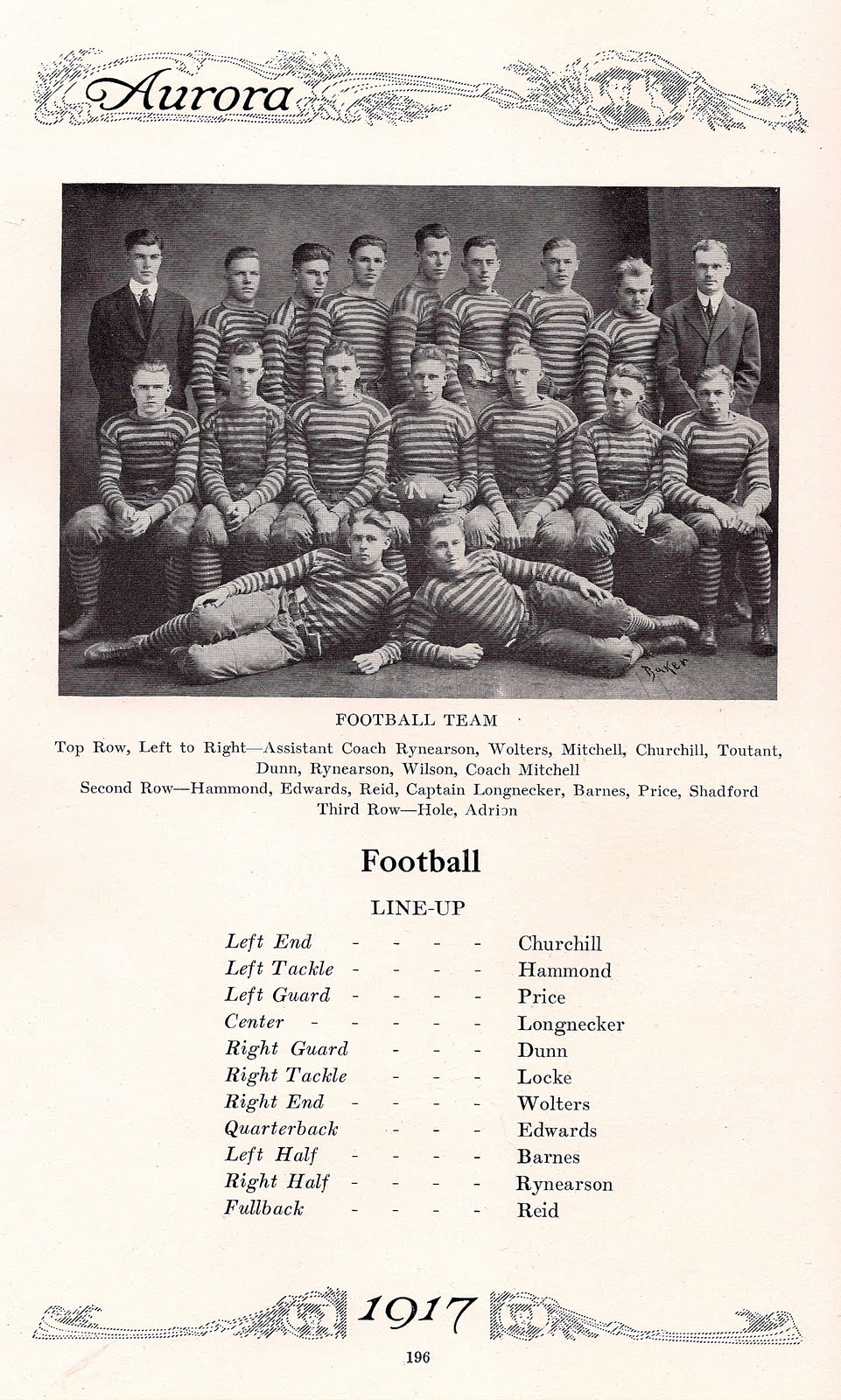
Eastern Michigan's football team in 1917

Eastern Michigan athletic teams have been successful on a national level, winning three NCAA Division II national championships and 13 NAIA Division I national championships in five different sports (baseball, men's cross country, men's swimming and diving, men's indoor track and field, and men's outdoor track and field).

EMU has also been NCAA Division I national runner-up twice in 1940 and 1976. In 1940, the men's cross country team finished second to the Indiana Hoosiers. In 1976, the baseball team was defeated by the Arizona Wildcats in the final game of the College World Series. The Eagles have the most MAC championships in a single sport, 29, in men's swimming and diving. For men's and women's Track and field (indoor and outdoor), collectively holds the record for most MAC titles out of all the EMU athletics teams.

Eastern's men's basketball team has appeared in four NCAA Division I tournaments, and have a 3–4 record, tied for third best among Michigan colleges. In the 1996 men's basketball tournament, Eastern Michigan defeated the Duke Blue Devils in the opening round.

The 2006–2007 season was a successful one for Eastern Michigan, as they won an EMU and Mid-American Conference record eight conference titles: Men's Cross Country, Men's Swimming And Diving, Women's Swimming And Diving, Softball, Men's Indoor Track, Women's Gymnastics, Men's Golf and Men's Outdoor Track. This beat the school's previous record of five titles as well as the previous MAC record of six.

In 1987, EMU won its first Mid-American Conference title then defeated 17 1/2-point favorite San Jose State in the California Bowl.

There have been small successes though, such as a 6–4 record against rivals the Western Michigan Broncos and the Central Michigan Chippewas in the 5 years under coach Jeff Genyk from 2004 to 2008, setting a school record for a 5-year span against Western and Central.

Since the 1991 season, Eastern Michigan athletic teams have gone by the nickname "Eagles". Prior to the 1991 season EMU used the name "Hurons". EMU used the Hurons name and Indian logo from 1929 until 1991. Despite much controversy, support of the Huron tribes in Oklahoma and Quebec, and anger among its alumni, EMU changed the logo after the Michigan Department of Civil Rights issued a report suggesting all schools drop such logos. During the Michigan State Normal College years the school went by the nicknames such as "Normalites" and "Men from Ypsi" and various other titles.

=== Esports ===
The Eastern Michigan University (EMU) Esports program has grown significantly, relocating from a small space in the REC/IM building to a state-of-the-art facility in the Student Center. This new location features over 20 computers, enabling competitive teams and community members to practice and connect. The facility allows EMU Esports to host in-person events and tournaments, such as a scholastic invitational for Valorant and Rocket League on November 9 and 10, 2024, while expanding its presence through weekly student outreach and social media. With improved facilities, the program aims to strengthen its community connections and establish a national reputation in collegiate esports.

== People ==
EMU has more than 145,000 living alumni. Notable politicians and public servants from Eastern Michigan include 7th Governor of North Dakota Frederick Fancher, 31st Governor of Michigan Fred W. Green, Michigan Supreme Court Chief Justice Marilyn Jean Kelly, Wisconsin Supreme Court Chief Justice Marvin B. Rosenberry, U.S. Senators Royal Copeland, Charles E. Potter, U.S. Representatives William W. Chalmers, William Horace Frankhauser, Patrick H. Kelley, Carl D. Pursell, Henry F. Thomas, Frank W. Wheeler, and Alfred Lucking, and former U.S. Secretary of Transportation Rodney E. Slater.

Billionaire Bruce T. Halle, founder of Roush Fenway Keselowski Racing Jack Roush are all also EMU alums. Other notable EMU alumni include Dann Florek, Winsor McCay, Nagarjuna, Greg Mathis, Dave Coverly, Ryan Drummond.

EMU alumni in the NBA include Earl Boykins, Kennedy McIntosh, and "the Iceman" George Gervin. NFL player Maxx Crosby attended Eastern Michigan University and will have the Football stadium named after him in 2024. Other notable NFL Players include Charlie Batch and T. J. Lang also attended Eastern Michigan. Additionally, multi-time Paralympic medalist Brittni Mason is pursuing a master's degree at EMU.

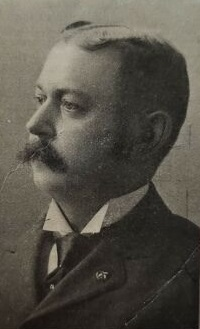
7th Governor of North Dakota Frederick Fancher

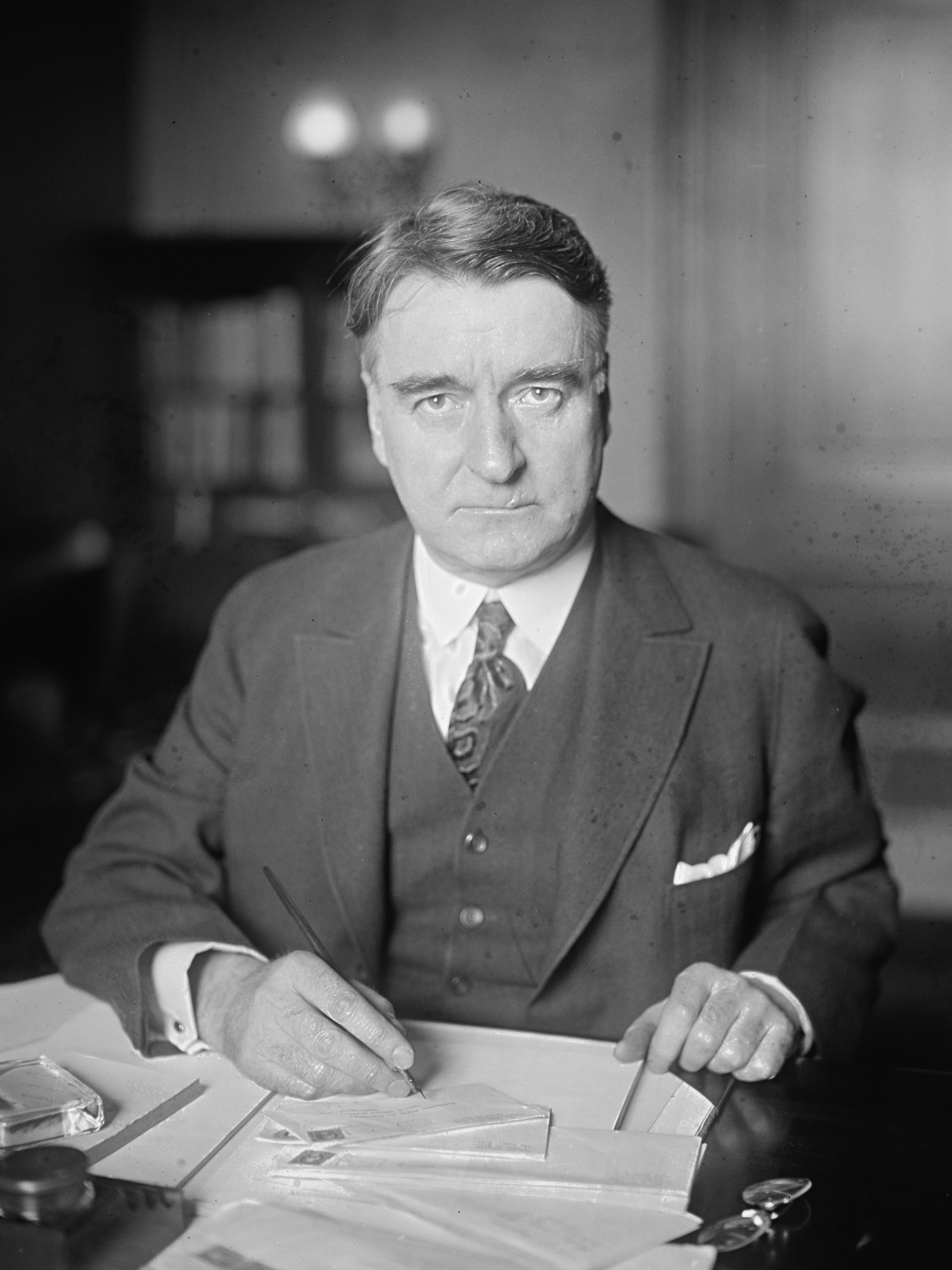
Former U.S. Senator from New York Royal Copeland

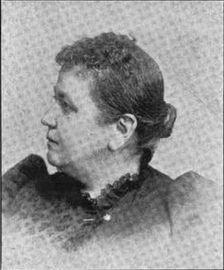
Writer M. E. C. Bates

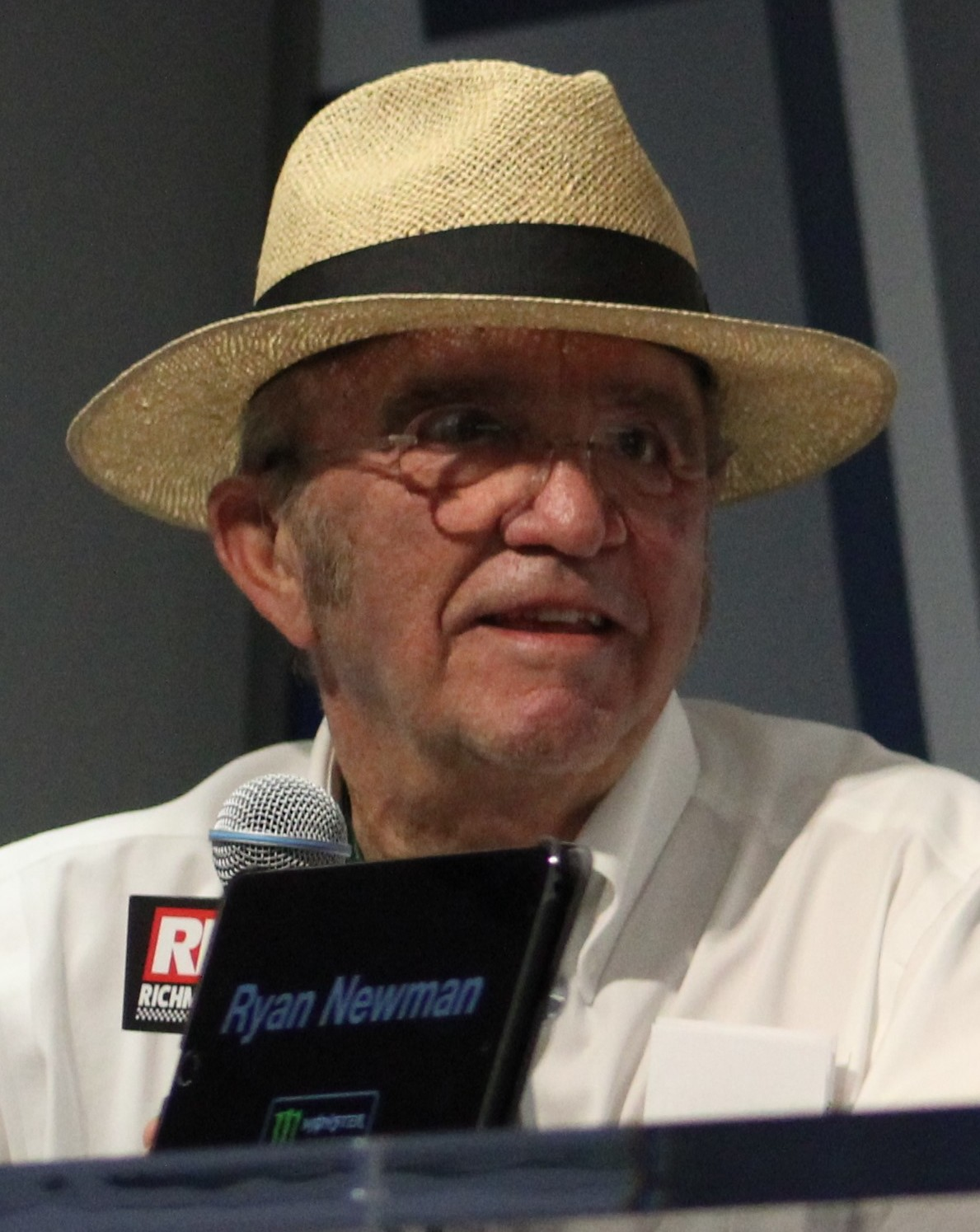
Founder of Roush Fenway Keselowski Racing Jack Roush

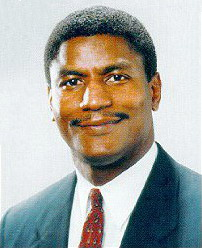
Former U.S. Secretary of Transportation Rodney Slater

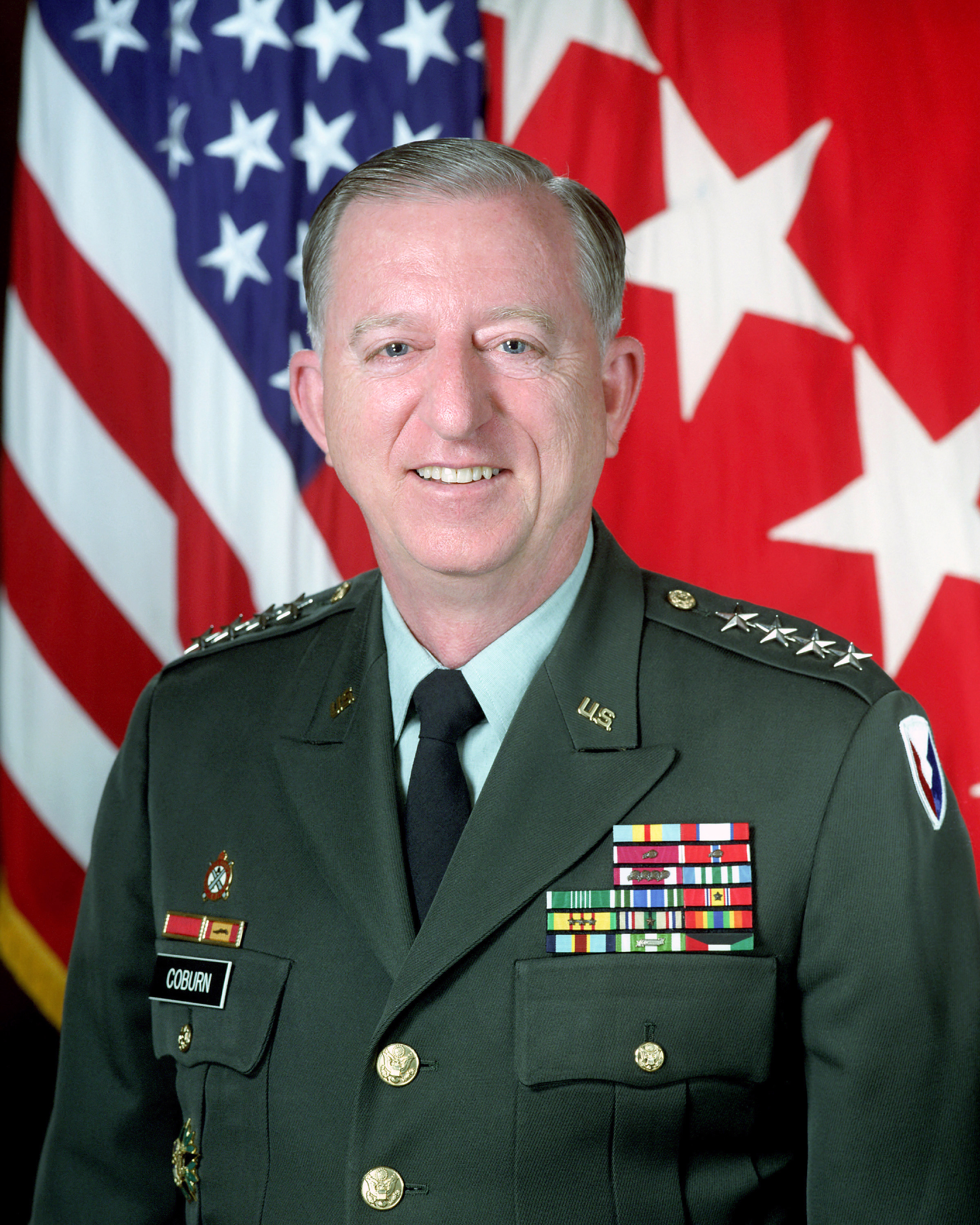
Four-star general John Coburn

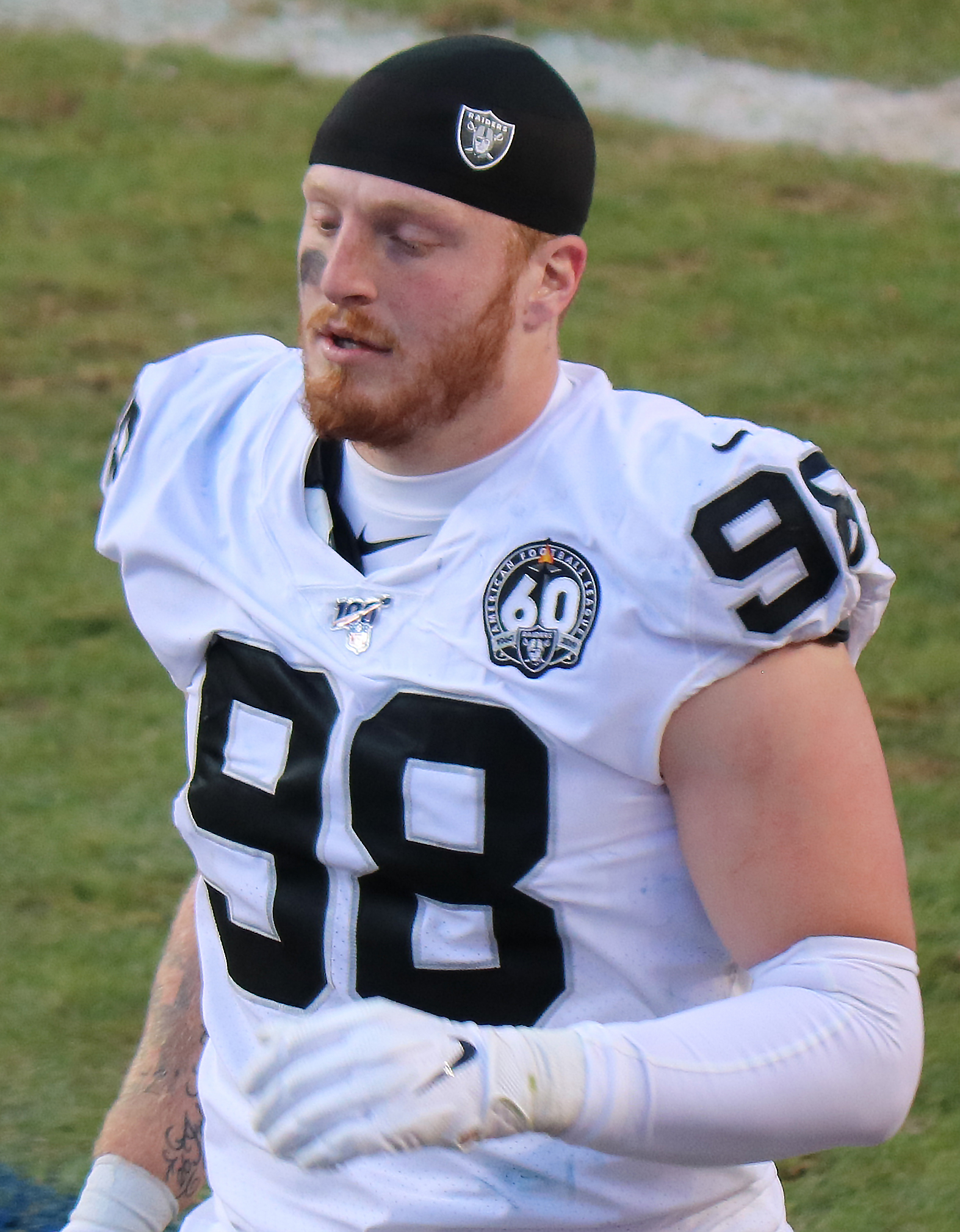
Las Vegas Raiders Defensive End Maxx Crosby
