= Paul Callow =

Canadian serial rapist

Paul Douglas Callow (born c. 1955) is a Canadian serial rapist who was convicted of sexually assaulting several women in the Toronto area in the mid-1980s. Because of his method of attack (entering his victims' homes through balconies off the ground) and the fact that his identity was unknown, he was called the Balcony Rapist by the popular media.

== Life in the 1980s ==
After stalking his victims, Callow climbed onto their second- or third-story balconies and entered through broken windows or doors. Callow had already sexually attacked two women in the 1970s before he sexually assaulted five women at knife-point during the Toronto attacks. His string of rapes in the Wellesley and Sherbourne area included the brutalization of a woman who became known as "Jane Doe".

== Jane Doe v. Board of Commissioners ==
His fifth victim, using the pseudonym "Jane Doe", successfully sued the Toronto police for not having warned women in her neighbourhood about the four earlier rapes. She also claimed that the police were using her as bait to draw out the predator. The police took the position that if they had publicized the fact that a serial rapist was attacking women in the area, he would have simply committed his crimes in a different location, making his apprehension difficult. In fact, the Toronto police had threatened to charge Doe with mischief, because she put up posters in her neighbourhood warning about the Balcony Rapist. In a case filed as Jane Doe v. Board of Commissioners of Police for the Municipality of Metropolitan Toronto, Doe won her case and on July 3, 1998, was awarded damages of $220,000 plus interest by the Ontario Court of Justice (General Division). She was subsequently named Woman of the Year by the Canadian women's magazine Chatelaine in 1999, and published the book The Story of Jane Doe: A Book About Rape in 2003.

== Prison and later life ==
Callow served the full length of his 20-year sentence in prison.

While in prison, Callow was accused by a prison employee of sexual assault. After this accusation, Callow refused to participate in any treatment programs.

On February 23, 2007, Callow, then 52 years old, was released from jail in British Columbia. He initially settled in Newton Town Centre in Surrey, British Columbia. Police did not release Callow's precise address. Following a protest in Surrey, Callow moved to New Westminster, British Columbia. On March 3, 2007, New Westminster had a rally of protest.

It was reported on March 7, 2007, that Callow lived in an emergency shelter in New Westminster, and the only help he receives is a 20-minute daily meeting with a third-year social work student. Callow was reported as saying he was "worried about vigilantism".

When he was sentenced, Callow was not designated a dangerous offender. Concern about his release has led to a proposal by some elected officials from New Westminster for legislative change allowing convicts to be designated dangerous offenders after they have been sentenced, if they exhibit violent behaviour while in jail.

== See also ==
- Duty to warn
