= Janet Conney v. The Regents of the University of California =

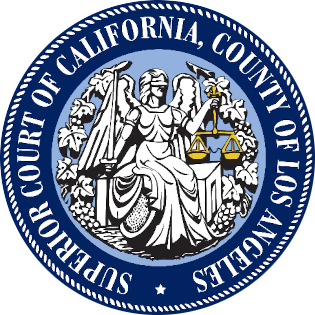
- Court: Los Angeles County Superior Court
- Full case name: Janet Conney, M.D. v. The Regents of the University of California, et al
- Decided: July 27, 2004

Janet Conney v. The Regents of the University of California, et al. was a case in which the Los Angeles County Superior Court, Second Appellate District, Division Seven awarded a $4.06 million judgment in March 2007, after the appeals court upheld the lower court ruling. A large portion of the award went to the 4 attorneys, while Conney received approximately $2.95 million of the judgment against the University of California in a sex discrimination and retaliation case.

The Regents' general counsel stated they did not believe the allegation was supported by evidence, and that the university would seek redress through the trial court and at the appellate level.

Conney won the suit and was awarded $4.06 million in March 2007. The California Supreme Court refused to hear the appeal filed by the Regents of the University of California.

The judge also awarded $515,450 in attorney’s fees. With interest and appellate attorney’s fees, the total award was over $4 million.

During the 9-day jury trial (because UCLA did not want to settle the initial claim of unfair pay), many professors and even the chairman of the department at UCLA testified. Many of their statements contradicted their own depositions, which had been taken about 4 months before the trial. Under oath, the professors testified there was a separate pot of money that the men received, in addition to their base salary. This was one of many incriminating pieces of testimony to which the jury agreed that Dr. Conney had been discriminated against on the basis of her gender. Another part of the award was for interference with current and also future pay and promotion.

== See also ==
- University of California v. Katherine Rosen
- Dr. Lauren Pinter-Brown v. Regents of the University of California
