= The Eastern Echo =

Newspaper in Ypsilanti, Michigan

- Type: Student newspaper
- Format: Broadsheet
- School: Eastern Michigan University
- Editor-in-chief: Lilly Kujawski
- Founded: 1881
- Political alignment: Nonpartisan
- Headquarters: Ypsilanti, Michigan
- Circulation: 7,000-12,000
- Website: easternecho.com

The Eastern Echo is the independent student newspaper of Eastern Michigan University in Ypsilanti, Michigan. The paper is funded through advertising revenue. The paper is published on Tuesdays during the fall and winter semesters. Although EMU funds a Student Media Director, that official has no editorial influence over the content of the Eastern Echo.

== History ==
The newspaper started as the Normal News in 1881 when the school was known as Normal College. It later became the Normal College News and, then, the Eastern Echo in 1956, when the university was renamed to Eastern Michigan College. The newspaper is currently operating out of the second floor of King Hall, a former dormitory which has been converted into office space for a number of campus organizations and services.

== Publishing and distribution ==
The Eastern Echo is available free at virtually any campus building at Eastern Michigan University and at more than 40 off-campus locations. Its circulation varies from 7,000 to 12,000 throughout the year. The paper also publishes its content, and archives dating to September 2003, on its website.
