= Murder of Laura Dickinson =

2006 murder in Michigan, United States

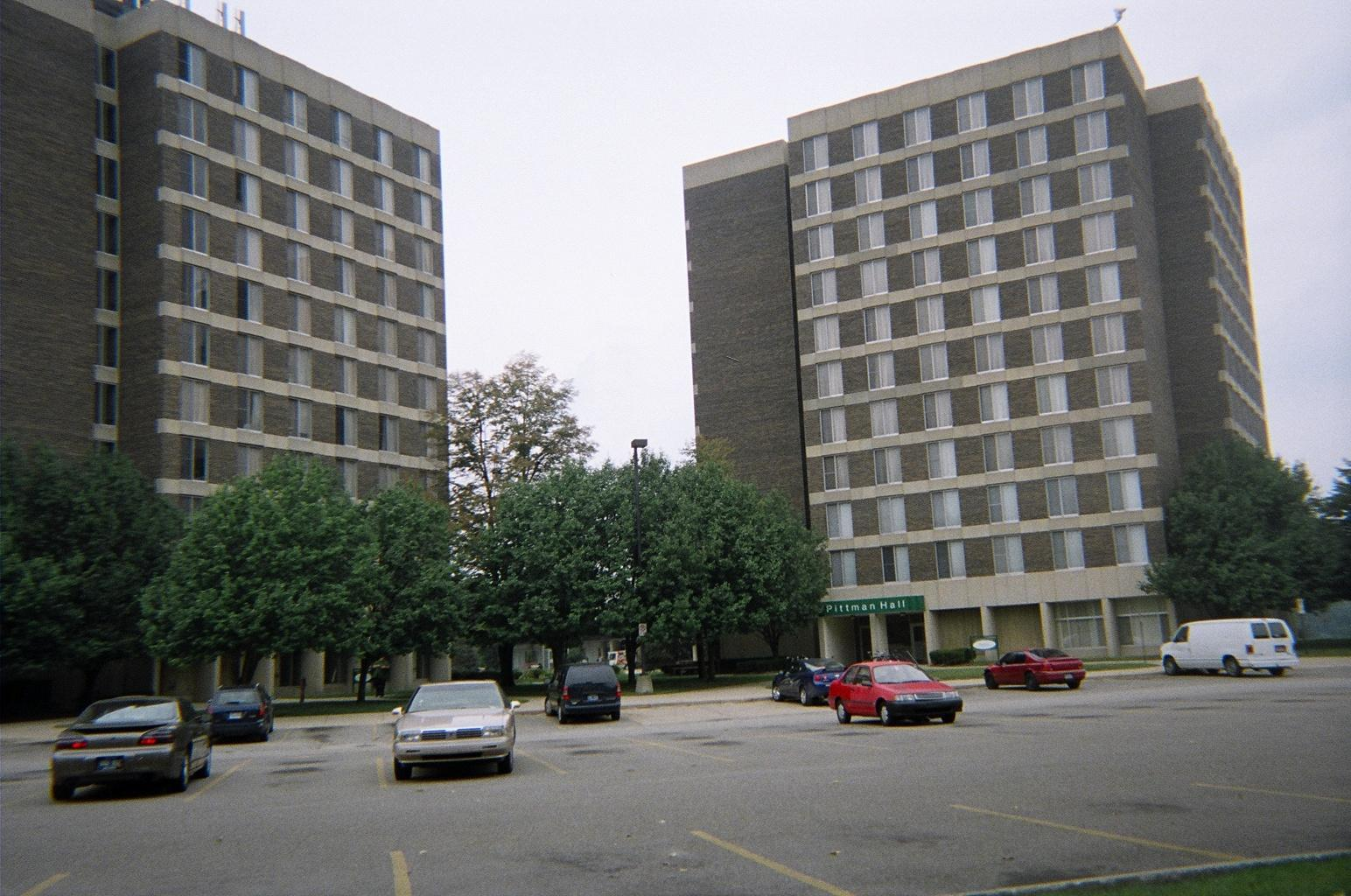
Hill Hall (left), the location of the murder, photographed in 2006

Laura Dickinson was a student at Eastern Michigan University who was murdered by a fellow student on December 13, 2006. The failure of university officials to notify students about the murder prompted an investigation, and EMU was eventually found to be in violation of the Clery Act.

== Sexual assault and murder ==
Dickinson was killed in her residence hall room in Hill Hall on December 13, 2006. DNA from semen found on her legs was matched to Orange Taylor III, also a student, who was convicted of the murder. According to police reports, the death was investigated as a homicide; however, this was denied by university officials and only officially announced on the day of Taylor's arrest, February 23, 2007. The arrest took place on the first day that students could not withdraw from classes and housing for a full refund.

== Aftermath ==
=== Violation of the Clery Act ===
A subsequent investigation by Detroit law firm Butzel Long found that EMU had violated the Clery Act by not notifying students of the attack and named Jim Vick, Vice President of Student Affairs, as the main source of the cover-up.

On July 3, 2007, the Department of Education report relating to the university's Clery Act violations was released to the public. It states, in part: "Several findings of noncompliance were discovered during the review which the Department [of Education] considers to be serious violations of the Clery Act." The full report was not released, though EMU released the executive summary of its response to the DOE report on July 27, 2007. In June 2008, the university announced that it had agreed to pay a fine of $357,000 for the violations of the Clery Act. The fine at the time was the largest on record for a university.

=== Settlement ===
On December 13, 2007, EMU settled with the family and estate of Laura Dickinson for $2.5 million. The settlement does not include any admission of liability by EMU.

=== Firing of university's president ===
The nationally reported scandal resulted in the firing of President John A. Fallon by the Board of Regents. He was notified of the unanimous vote of the Board to fire him by a letter sent to his home on July 15, 2007. Although no formal reason for the termination was given, his dismissal was considered by many to be a direct result of his role in the cover-up of the on-campus homicide. At a special meeting called by the Board of Regents on Monday, July 16, 2007, the separation of President John Fallon was officially announced along with the separation of Jim Vick, Vice President for Student Affairs, and Cindy Hall, Director of Public Safety and Chief of Police. A letter of discipline was placed in University Counsel Kenneth McKanders' file. It was also announced that Donald Loppnow, Provost and Vice President for Academic Affairs, would be appointed Executive Vice President and in this role serve as Acting President until an Interim President is selected.

=== Conviction ===
On April 7, 2008, a jury convicted Orange Taylor III of first-degree murder, assault with intent to commit sexual penetration, home invasion, and theft charges. He was sentenced to life imprisonment on May 7, 2008.

== See also ==
- List of homicides in Michigan
- Duty to warn
- Clery Act
