= Swoop (Eastern Michigan University) =

Eagle mascot of Eastern Michigan University

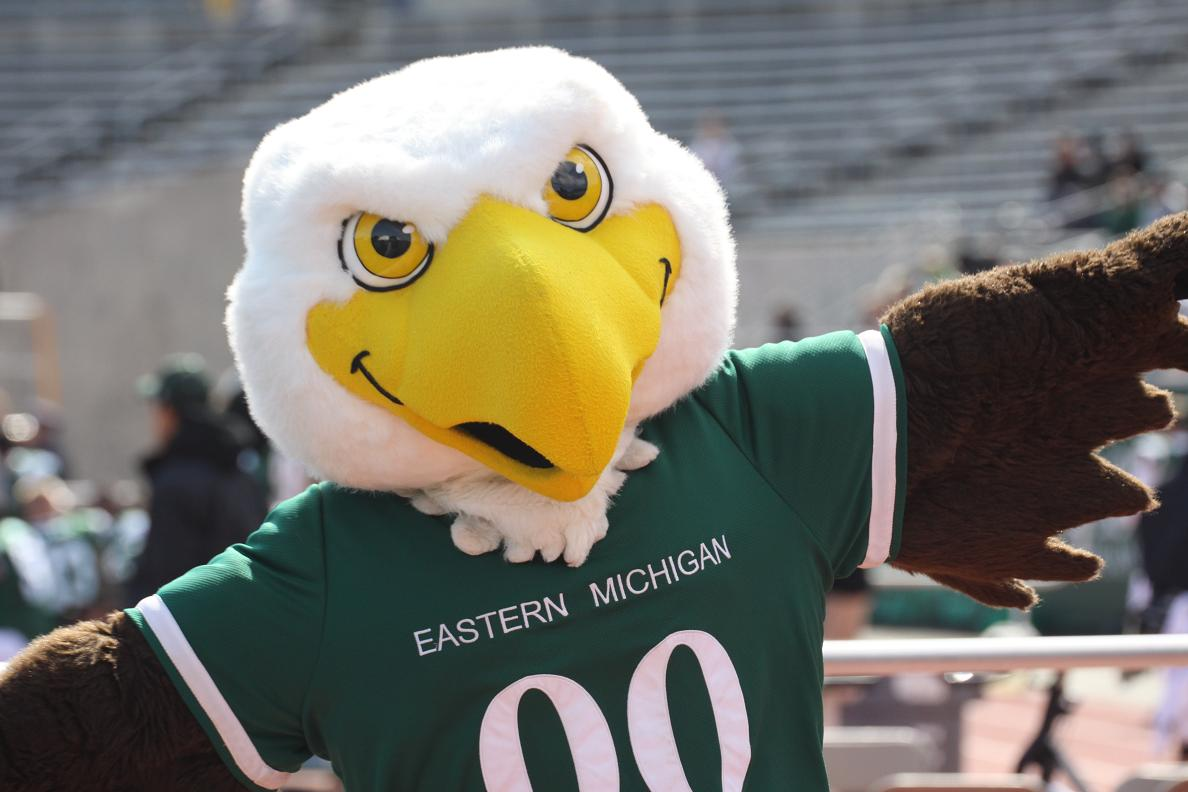
- "Swoop", the EMU mascot, at the 2010 homecoming football game against the Ohio Bobcats.
- University: Eastern Michigan University
- Conference: MAC
- Description: American bald eagle
- First seen: 1994

Swoop is the mascot used for the Eastern Michigan Eagles to represent its NCAA Division 1 Athletic program. EMU is one of several American universities using the name Swoop as their athletic program mascots. The "Swoop" character is sometimes depicted as an American bald eagle wearing an EMU sports jersey.

== History ==
Swoop is the mascot that represents Eastern Michigan University. The athletics teams are nicknamed the "Eagles". The Eagles name was officially adopted on May 22, 1991, when the EMU Board of Regents voted to replace the existing Huron (Native American) nickname and logo with the new one. In 1994, EMU adopted "Swoop" as the official mascot for the university.
