= Eberhard's =

Former supermarket chain in the US

Eberhard's or Eberhard was a supermarket chain based in Grand Rapids, Michigan. The company ceased operations in the early 1990s succumbing to increased competition, and the inability to keep up with evolving supermarket trends.

Between 1985 and 1986, Spartan Stores was in negotiations to buy Eberhards' stores and headquarters/distribution center. That deal never materialized, instead, each store was sold individually to a variety of people and groups, including chains and managers of each store. In its prime, the chain operated 41 locations around Michigan.

Grand Valley State University's L.V. Eberhard Center in downtown Grand Rapids is named for the company founder who donated funds for the construction of the business oriented academic building.
