= Duty to warn =

Legal concept

A duty to warn is a concept that arises in the law of torts in a number of circumstances, indicating that a party will be held liable for injuries caused to another, where the party had the opportunity to warn the other of a hazard and failed to do so.

== History ==
In the United States, two landmark legal cases established therapists' legal obligations to breach confidentiality if they believe a client poses a risk to himself or others. The first was Tarasoff v. Regents of the University of California (1976), where a therapist failed to inform a young woman and her parents of specific death threats made by a client. The other case was Jablonski by Pahls v. United States (1983), which further extended the responsibilities of duty to warn by including the review of previous records that might include a history of violent behavior.

== Product liability ==
The duty to warn arises in product liability cases, as manufacturers can be held liable for injuries caused by their products if the product causes an injury to a consumer and the manufacturer fails to supply adequate warnings about the risks of using the product (such as side effects from pharmacy prescriptions) or if they fail to supply adequate instructions for the proper use of the product (such as a precaution to use safety glasses when using a drill). If the manufacturer fails to supply these warnings, the law will consider the product itself to be defective.

A lawsuit by a party injured by a product, where the manufacturer failed to properly warn, is usually brought as a "negligence" action, but it could be filed as a "strict liability" claim or as a "breach of warranty of merchantability" case.

Not long after launching its Note 7 smartphone in August 2016, Samsung received many reports of burning phones. Samsung had no choice but to recall all the Galaxy Note 7s, which had cost the company around $5.3bn. Following the recall, the Federal Aviation Administration prohibited people from turning a Galaxy Note 7 on, packing it in the checked luggage, or charging it while on the plane. On October 11, 2016 Samsung stopped the production and issued a warning for people to turn the Galaxy Note 7 off and to not use it any longer. Samsung also told all of its global partners to stop selling the phone because of concerns about the product's safety. After testing 200,000 devices and 30,000 batteries, Samsung found that the overheating and the burning phones resulted from an error in the design and manufacture of the batteries on the part of its two suppliers.

An issue in product liability cases is whether the product warranted a duty to warn about known dangers. In Pavlides v. Galveston Yacht Basin (1984) the Court of Appeals for the Fifth Circuit noted "a presumption ... that, if there had been an adequate warning, the user would have read, understood, and heeded the instructions".

In the popularized 1994 Liebeck v. McDonald's Restaurants case, where the individual Liebeck sued McDonald's for damages for injuries due to spilling hot coffee on her lap, McDonald's was cited not to have properly warned consumers about the inherent danger of their coffee product, which was heated way beyond the average chain coffee's temperature. In addition, McDonald's was aware of previous injuries from hot coffee injuries and had not properly warned the consumers, which resulted in the court awarding Liebeck $640,000 in damages, which was later settled for an undisclosed amount.

== Property ownership ==
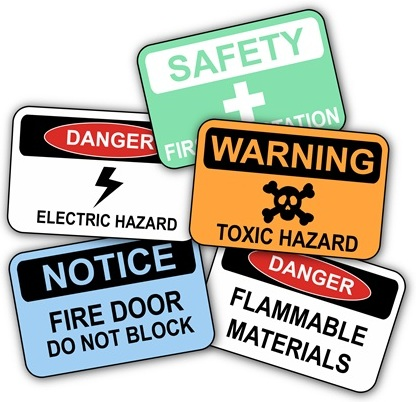
Warning signs such as those depicted in the image are often used to warn visitors of potential hazards.

Most notably, a property owner has a duty to warn persons on the property of various hazards, depending on the status of the person on the property. For example, the property owner must warn an anticipated or discovered trespasser of deadly conditions known to the property owner, but that would be hidden from the trespasser. The property owner must warn licensees of all known hazards (whether deadly or not), and must warn invitees of all dangers that the property owner can discover through a reasonable inspection of the property.

== Clinical psychology and psychiatry ==
In clinical psychological practice in the United States, duty to warn requires a clinician who has reasonable grounds to believe that a client may be in imminent danger of harming themselves or others to warn the possible victims. Duty to warn is among the few exceptions to a client's right to confidentiality and the therapist's ethical obligation to maintain confidential information related in the context of the therapeutic relationship. In the American Psychological Association's Ethical Principles of Psychologists and Code of Conduct, the therapist's duty to warn is implicitly contained within the guidelines for disclosure of confidential information without the consent of the client: "Psychologists disclose confidential information without the consent of the individual only as mandated by law, or where permitted by law for a valid purpose such as to … protect the client/patient, psychologist, or others from harm." In situations when there is cause for serious concern about a client harming someone, the clinician must breach confidentiality to warn the identified victim/third party about imminent danger. Although laws vary somewhat in different states, in general, the danger must be imminent and the breach of confidentiality should be made to someone who is in a position to reduce the risk of the danger. People who would be appropriate recipients of such information would include the intended victim and law enforcement.

Duty to warn is embedded in the historical context of two rulings (1974 and 1976) of the California Supreme Court in the case of Tarasoff v. Regents of the University of California. The court held that mental health professionals have a duty to protect individuals who are being threatened with bodily harm by a patient. The original 1974 decision mandated warning the threatened individual, but a 1976 rehearing of the case by the California Supreme Court called for a "duty to protect" the intended victim.

Explicit in the court's decision was the principle that the confidentiality of the therapeutic relationship is subordinate to the safety of society and its members. Despite the value and importance of protecting the client and their feelings, and thus the physician-client relationship, the court decided that the clinician's duty to society as a citizen of that society places certain limitations on the clinician's loyalty to a client's secrets, divulged in the context of the therapeutic relationship.

Limitations to confidentiality are a critical concern for clinicians, because a relationship of trust between the therapist and client is the prerequisite context for therapeutic growth. Without the client's expectation that the therapist will honor the client's confidences divulged in the therapeutic dialogue, the client will not have the freedom to unveil the most troublesome and private issues that are matters of the utmost concern and need for intervention. Some argue that if clients cannot depend on confidentiality in all matters that are related in therapy, potentially dangerous clients, who may be most in need of psychological services, will avoid therapy, thus missing the opportunity for intervention.

Other cases similar to the issues addressed in the Tarasoff case have been brought to the attention of the courts, such as the Jablonski by Pahls v. United States. The conclusion of that case extended the responsibility entailed in the duty to warn with the judgment that the clinician may be liable for failure to review previous records, which may contain a history of previous violent behavior, a predictor of potential future violence.

Recent consideration of applying the duty to warn has raised questions regarding therapists' responsibility to breach confidentiality in order to report clients' nonviolent behaviors which may pose danger to others, as in the case of clients with HIV/AIDS.

== Construction ==
The existence and extent of a contractual duty to warn in construction cases is discussed in the England and Wales High Court (Technology and Construction Court) case of Cleightonhills v Bembridge Marine Ltd and Others (2012).

== Criminal activity ==
=== Website users ===
In Jane Doe No. 14 v. Internet Brands, Inc., the Jane Doe plaintiff alleged that Internet Brands, Inc.'s failure to warn users of its networking website, modelmayhem.com, caused her to be a victim of a rape scheme. She alleged that defendant Internet Brands knew about the rapists but did not warn her or the website's other users. She filed an action against Internet Brands alleging liability for negligence under California law based on that failure to warn. On May 31, 2016, the US Court of Appeals for the 9th Circuit ruled that the Communications Decency Act does not bar Jane Doe's failure to warn claim.

=== Potential targets of a serial rapist ===
==== Jane Doe v. Metropolitan Toronto (Municipality) Commissioners of Police ====
In the early morning hours of August 24, 1986, a woman who lived in a second-floor apartment in Toronto was raped at knifepoint by Paul Callow, who had broken into her apartment from a balcony. At the time, the plaintiff was the fifth victim of similar crimes by Callow, who would become known as the "balcony rapist". In 1998, this woman was successful in her lawsuit against the Metropolitan Toronto Police Force for damages on the grounds that the police force had conducted a negligent investigation and failed to warn women of the risk of an attack by Callow.

==== Jane Doe v. Royal Newfoundland Constabulary ====
In December 2012, a woman, who later became a Jane Doe plaintiff, was attacked by Sofyan Boalag in St. John's, Newfoundland. This assault was the last of six assaults between September and December 2012. Boalag was charged with 23 criminal offences in relation to complaints from multiple victims. In 2016, he was convicted of multiple offenses including robbery, three counts of sexual assault with a weapon, and choking Doe until she passed out.

In January 2016, Doe commenced a lawsuit against the Royal Newfoundland Constabulary, alleging police failed to properly warn the public that a predator was stalking young women. According to the statement of claim, all of the attacks took place in a similar part of the city and involved people with similar characteristics—six young women, including one girl under 16 years of age.

=== College and university students ===
In 1986, 19-year-old Jeanne Clery was raped and murdered in her Lehigh University dorm room. Her parents claimed that there was a lack of information provided to students and families about the rapid increase of violent and non-violent incidents on campuses and that university administrators had failed to warn students and the public. A result of these claims was the passing of the Clery Act which requires colleges and universities in the United States to publish campus crime reports. In 2008, Eastern Michigan University was fined $357,500 for violating the Clery Act. US federal officials cited the university for "an egregious violation" for failing to notify the public of the murder of Laura Dickinson in her residence hall room.

=== U.S. Intelligence Community ===
In July 2015, then–Director of National Intelligence James Clapper formally issued a directive to the agencies of the United States Intelligence Community that they had a "duty to warn" both U.S. and non-U.S. persons of impending harm against them. The directive included exemptions for occasions that required the protection of sensitive "sources and methods," cases where the intended victim was a member of a terrorist group or a violent criminal, or if the intended victim was already aware of the threat. Many U.S. intelligence agencies had informally observed such a practice for decades before Clapper's directive.

In 2019, the Committee to Protect Journalists sued the Trump administration for information on whether the U.S. government had followed its "duty to warn" principle in the case of the murdered Saudi-American journalist Jamal Khashoggi. In August 2021, a U.S. appeals court ruled that U.S. intelligence agencies were not required to disclose whether they had information about threats to Khashoggi's life before his assassination.

Before the January 3, 2024, Kerman bombings, a terrorist attack carried out by ISIS-K suicide bombers that killed 94 people and injured 284 others, the U.S. intelligence community provided Iran, often considered an adversary of the U.S., with an early warning under its "duty to warn" policy. U.S. officials noted that the information given was sufficiently specific regarding the location and timely enough that it may have proved useful to Tehran in thwarting the attack.

In March 2024, the United States privately warned Russian officials of the danger of an impending attack from Islamic State – Khorasan Province (IS-KP or ISIS–K), from intelligence gathered earlier in March, under the US intelligence community's "duty to warn" requirement. Later that month the group would carry out the Crocus City Hall attack which killed 139 people.

== See also ==
- Duty to protect
- Goldwater rule – Rule governing how psychiatrists may give opinions on public figures
