= Duty to protect =

Duty in medical law and ethics

In medical law and medical ethics, the duty to protect is the responsibility of a mental health professional to protect patients and others from foreseeable harm. If a client makes statements that suggest suicidal or homicidal ideation, the clinician has the responsibility to take steps to warn potential victims, and if necessary, initiate involuntary commitment. The majority of people have, at some stage, had thoughts about killing someone, but the seriousness or intention of carrying out these thoughts may differ among persons and individual circumstances.

== United States ==
The duty to protect was established by Tarasoff v. Regents of the University of California, which has been widely adopted by other states. This case determined that the clinician has the duty to warn an identifiable victim. Jablonski by Pahls v. United States extended this responsibility to include the involuntary commitment of a dangerous individual. Ewing v. Goldstein extended the duty to protect to include acting upon the statements of third parties that indicate possible threat, and determined that it was not sufficiently discharged by initiating involuntary commitment; warning identifiable victims is also necessary.

== United Kingdom ==
Selwood v Durham City Council created a limited duty to warn in the United Kingdom. The case involved a social worker, Claire Selwood, who was seriously injured after being assaulted by an individual who was being treated by a mental health professionals employed by Durham City Council. Selwood worked closely with the mental health workers responsible for the individuals care, though did not have the same employer. During treatment the individual said of Selwood, that they would "kill her on the spot" if they saw her. In her ruling, Dame Janet Smith said that there was a distinction between a duty to someone working closely with a defendant, as in this case, and the public at large.

The Counter-Terrorism and Security Act 2015 created a duty of individuals working in healthcare and education to report individuals deemed at risk of radicalisation to the police where they will be invited to participate in Channel (part of the UK's CONTEST antiterrorism program), a program that refers individuals to other services. The passing of this legislation resulted in an open letter by academics predicting that this legislation would create a chilling effect and arguing that the lack of open debate would create greater risk for society.

== Criticism ==
Statistical modelling estimate that duty to protect laws result in a 5% increase in homicides and an 8-10% increase in adolescent suicide. The increase in homicide may be due to patients withholding homicidal thoughts, therapists choosing not to explore homicidal thoughts, or therapists choosing not to treat high-risk patients due to legal risk.

The duty to protect has been criticized by some clinical psychologists because it may prevent people seeking help and in fact may cause unnecessary violence because it prevents clients from getting support in resolving their problems, and that it is peculiar that a friend or acquaintance has no duty to divulge information, while a psychotherapist who is seemingly in a position of trust must. In the Tarasoff case, the police had been warned about Podar resulting in his being questioned, released, and then ceasing to work with his psychiatrist. The violation of confidentiality in this case could be viewed as the cause of the murder.

== See also ==
- Mandated reporter
- Duty to rescue
- Warren v. District of Columbia, a United States District of Columbia Court of Appeals case that held that the police do not owe a specific duty to provide police services to specific citizens based on the public duty doctrine.
- DeShaney v. Winnebago County, a United States Supreme Court case that held that a state government agency's failure to prevent child abuse by a custodial parent does not violate the child's Fourteenth Amendment rights.
- Recidivism
- Relapse
