= John A. Fallon =

American academic administrator

John A. Fallon III is a university administrator and former president of Eastern Michigan University. Dr. Fallon began his tenure at EMU on July 18, 2005, after serving as president of SUNY Potsdam and William Penn College. He had been appointed by the EMU Board of Regents in March 2005. Fallon was terminated by Eastern Michigan University on July 15, 2007, following a scandal related to the murder of Laura Dickinson, which took place on the campus the previous year.

== Early life ==
Fallon grew up in Michigan and attended three of the state's public universities. He earned a Bachelor of Science degree in education from Western Michigan University, followed by a master's degree in educational administration from Northern Michigan University, and a doctorate in educational administration from Michigan State University.

== Career ==
Fallon has served on the faculties at Ball State University and Saginaw Valley State University, in addition to serving as presidents for SUNY Potsdam and William Penn College. Fallon was appointed by the Eastern Michigan University Board of Regents in March 2005. He was eventually fired by EMU on July 15, 2007.

Although the university did not state a reason for his firing, it is believed to have been related to Fallon's handling of the death of Laura Dickinson, an Eastern Michigan University student, killed in her dormitory on December 15, 2006. Fallon and other university officials initially stated that her death was not the result of foul play. That initial statement was proven wrong after another student at the university was arrested for Dickinson's rape and murder.

Fallon sued EMU to try to regain his old position, alleging the board of regents used Dickinson's death to oust him before he could go public with allegations surrounding their "culture of secrecy".

In 2011, Fallon returned to working at Ball State University.
