= Tarasoff v. Regents of the University of California =

1976 American case on the duty to protect

- Supreme Court of California

Decided July 1, 1976
- Full case name: Vitali Tarasoff, et al., Plaintiffs-Petitioners v. Regents of the University of California, et al., Defendants-Respondents.
- Citation(s): 17 Cal. 3d 425, 551 P.2d 334, 131 Cal. Rptr. 14

Case history
- Prior history: Appeal from sustained demurrer

Holding
- Psychotherapists have a duty to protect an individual they reasonably believe to be at risk of injury on the basis of a patient's confidential statements.

Court membership
- Chief Justice: Donald Wright
- Associate Justices: Raymond L. Sullivan, Marshall F. McComb, Matthew O. Tobriner, William P. Clark, Jr., Stanley Mosk, Frank K. Richardson

Case opinions
- Majority: Tobriner, joined by Wright, Sullivan, Richardson
- Concur/dissent: Mosk
- Dissent: Clark, joined by McComb

Tarasoff v. Regents of the University of California, 17 Cal. 3d 425, 551 P.2d 334, 131 Cal. Rptr. 14 (Cal. 1976), was a landmark American legal case in which the Supreme Court of California held that mental health professionals have a duty to protect individuals who are being threatened with bodily harm by a patient. The original 1974 decision mandated warning the threatened individual, but a 1976 rehearing of the case by the California Supreme Court called for a "duty to protect" the intended victim. The professional may discharge the duty in several ways, including notifying police, warning the intended victim, and/or taking other reasonable steps to protect the threatened individual.

== History ==
Prosenjit Poddar was a student from Bengal, India, who entered the University of California, Berkeley, as a graduate student in September 1967 and resided at its International House. In the fall of 1968 he met Tatiana Tarasoff at a folk dancing class. After Tarasoff kissed Poddar on New Year's Eve he developed a liking for her, but she did not reciprocate his affections. When Tarasoff told him she was involved with other men, he began to stalk her. He became depressed, neglected his studies and his health, and kept to himself; he spoke disjointedly and often wept. He had occasional meetings with Tarasoff and secretly tape-recorded their conversations in an attempt to discover why she did not love him.

During the summer of 1969, Tarasoff visited South America. Poddar began to improve and entered therapy with Lawrence Moore, a psychologist at the university's student health service. When Poddar confided to Moore that he intended to kill Tarasoff, Moore wrote to the campus police saying that Poddar was suffering from acute and severe paranoid schizophrenia, and recommending that he be civilly committed as dangerous. Poddar was detained but shortly released, as he appeared rational. Moore's supervisor, Harvey Powelson, then ordered that Poddar not be subject to further detention. Neither Tarasoff nor her parents received any warning.

In October, after Tarasoff had returned, Poddar stopped seeing Moore. He befriended Tarasoff's brother and moved in with him. Several weeks later, on October 27, 1969, Poddar carried out the plan he had confided to Moore, stabbing and killing Tarasoff. Tarasoff's parents sued Moore and various other employees of the university.

Poddar was convicted of second-degree murder, but the conviction was overturned on the grounds that the jury had been inadequately instructed, and Poddar was released on the condition that he return to India.

== Opinion of the court ==
The California Supreme Court found that a mental health professional has a duty not only to a patient but also to individuals who are specifically being threatened by a patient. This decision has since been adopted by most states in the U.S. and is widely influential in jurisdictions outside the U.S. as well.

Justice Mathew O. Tobriner wrote the holding in the majority opinion. "We conclude that the public policy favoring protection of the confidential character of patient-psychotherapist communications must yield to the extent to which disclosure is essential to avert danger to others. The protective privilege ends where the public peril begins."

Justice Mosk wrote a partial dissent, arguing that (1) the rule in future cases should be one of the actual subjective prediction of violence on the part of the psychiatrist, which occurred in this case, not one based on objective professional standards, because predictions are inherently unreliable; and (2) the psychiatrists notified the police, who were presumably in a better position to protect Tarasoff than she would be to protect herself.

Justice Clark dissented, quoting a law review article that stated, "…the very practice of psychiatry depends upon the reputation in the community that the psychiatrist will not tell."

== Reception ==
Some decried the court's decision as a limitation of the foundation for the therapeutic relationship and progress, the client's expectation of confidentiality. In 1979, Max Siegel, a former president of the American Psychological Association, defended the therapist's right to confidentiality as sacrosanct, under any circumstances. Siegel suggested that had Poddar's psychologist maintained confidentiality, instead of alerting the police, Poddar might have remained in counseling and Tarasoff's death might have been averted through Poddar's psychological treatment.

== Subsequent developments ==
As of 2012, a duty to warn or protect is mandated and codified in legislative statutes of 23 states, while the duty is not codified in a statute but is present in the common law supported by precedent in 10 states. Eleven states have a permissive duty, and six states are described as having no statutes or case law offering guidance.

Despite initial commentators' predictions of negative consequences for psychotherapy because of the Tarasoff ruling, court decisions show otherwise. An analysis of 70 cases that went to appellate courts between 1985 and 2006 found that only four of the six rulings in favor of the plaintiff cited Tarasoff statutes; courts ruled in favor of the defendant in 46 cases and sent 17 cases back to lower courts. However, courts do rule in victims' favor in clear-cut cases of failure to warn or protect, such as the case of a psychiatrist who committed rape during a child psychiatry fellowship, for which he was recommended even after telling his own psychiatrist about his sexual attraction to children.

In 2018, the Court held that universities should protect students in the Regents of University of California v. Superior Court of Los Angeles County.
