= History of Eastern Michigan University =

A panoramic view of the campus in 1908: Welch, Starkweather, and Sherzer in view

Eastern Michigan University was founded in 1849 by the state of Michigan, and opened in 1853 as Michigan State Normal School. Michigan State Normal School was the first in Michigan and the first normal school created outside the original 13 colonies.

In 1899, the school became the Michigan State Normal College when it created the first four-year curriculum for a normal college in the nation. Normal began the twentieth century as Michigan's premier teacher-preparatory school and had become the first teacher-training school in the United States to have a four-year degree program.

With the additions of departments and the large educational enrollment after World War II, the school became Eastern Michigan College in 1956. In 1959 the school became Eastern Michigan University after establishing the Graduate School.

Today the university's total student population averages about 23,000, of whom roughly 5,000 are graduate students.

== Origins ==
University Presidents
President	Institution	Years
Adonijah Strong Welch	MSNS	1851–1865
David Porter Mayhew	MSNS	1865–1870
Charles FitzRoy Bellows	MSNS	1870–1871
Joseph Estabrook	MSNS	1871–1880
Malcolm MacVicar	MSNS	1880–1881
Daniel Putnam	MSNS	1880–1883
Edwin Willits	MSNS	1883–1885
Daniel Putnam	MSNS	1885–1886
John Mayhelm Barry Sill	MSNS	1886–1893
Richard Gause Boone	MSNS, MSNC	1893–1899
Elmer A. Lyman	MSNC	1900–1902
Lewis Henry Jones	MSNC	1903–1911
Charles McKenny	MSNC	1912–1933
John M. Munson	MSNC	1933–1948
Eugene B. Elliott	MSNC, EMC & EMU	1948–1965
Harold E. Sponberg	EMU	1965–1974
James H. Brickley	EMU	1974–1978
John W. Porter	EMU	1979–1989
William E. Shelton	EMU	1989–2000
Samuel A. Kirkpatrick	EMU	2001–2004
Craig D. Willis	EMU	2004–2005
John A. Fallon	EMU	2005–2007
Donald M. Loppnow	EMU	2007–2008
Susan Martin	EMU	2008–2015
Kim Schatzel	EMU	2015–2016
James Smith	EMU	2016–Present
*MSNS - Michigan State Normal School; MSNC - Michigan State Normal College; EMC - Eastern Michigan College; EMU - Eastern Michigan University

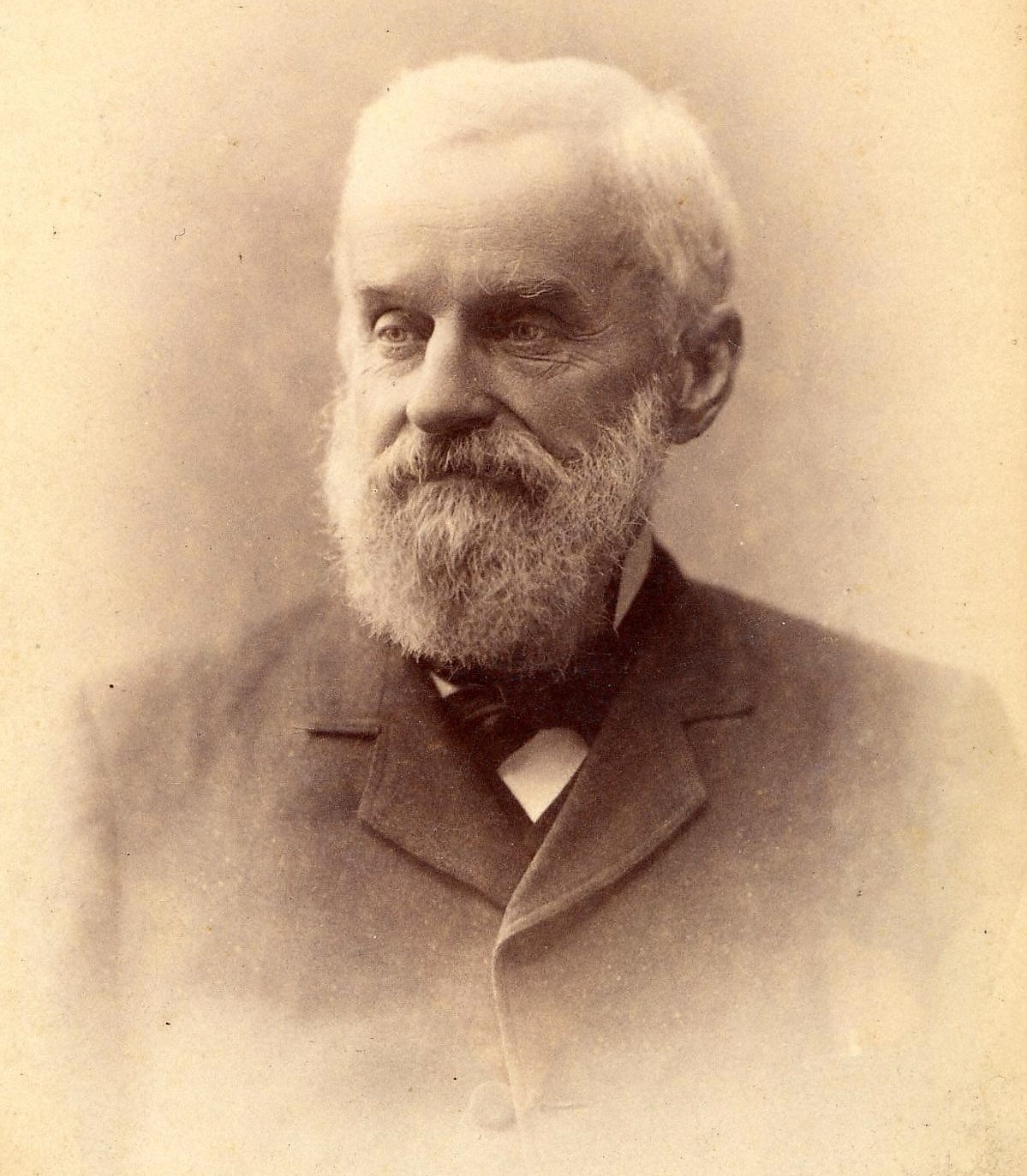
Adonijah Welch, the first principal of the Michigan State Normal School.

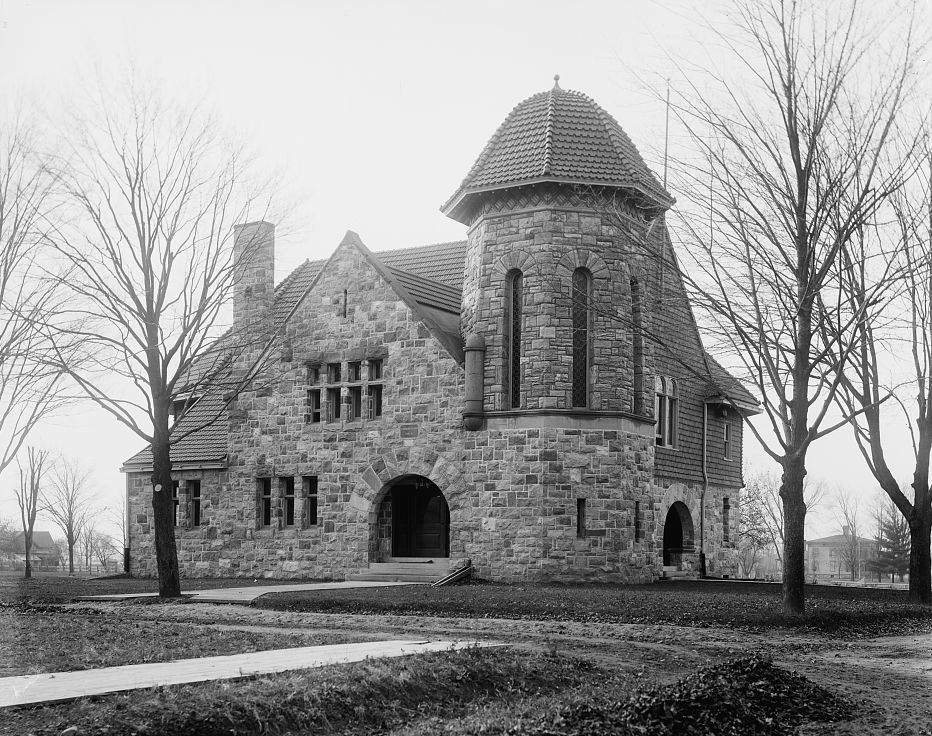
Starkweather Hall, sometime between 1900 and 1909.

Michigan State Normal School (1849–1898) was founded in 1849 and opened its doors in 1853 as Michigan State Normal School. Michigan State Normal School was the first in Michigan and the first normal school created outside the original 13 colonies.

Adonijah Welch served as the first principal of Michigan State Normal School from 1851 to 1865. Later in his life Welch served as a United States Senator from Florida and as the first president of Iowa State Agricultural College (now Iowa State University).

The normal schools were aimed to train teachers for common schools, which were being established at a rapid rate in new towns throughout the state. Michigan created a state educational system modeled on that of Germany. When the school was founded, the state of Michigan had only been admitted to the union for 12 years. Michigan State Normal School was the first educator training school west of the Allegheny Mountains.

Students could enroll in Michigan State Normal School at a much earlier age than the typical student today. Admission requirements indicated that students enrolling in the English Course must be at least 14 years of age. Those wishing to take the Classical Course must be at least 13 years of age. When it opened, Normal could admit students with high school diplomas or pass the entrance exam. Normal was able to grant high school diplomas and teaching certificates to qualified graduates. Classes started on March 29, 1853, with a total of one hundred and twenty-two enrolled.

In 1853, students could choose from two programs of study. The first was a two-year plan of study called the "English Course" and the other was the three-year "Classical Course." The English Course aimed to educate future teachers a broad range of academic subjects that would be need to be taught in primary schools. The Classical Course focused on language instruction for educators who would teach at a secondary level. Tuition rates were $3 per term for students preparing to be teachers and $4 for Classics. Those preparing for college paid $8 a term for Classics and $6 for English. This was a method to encourage students to become educators.

None of the original buildings from the Michigan State Normal School survived. Many of the buildings were built with wood frames, which does not last over time for most buildings. Many of the buildings at the heart of the campus were rebuilt.

The school grew rapidly in student population and variety of classes offered. During the 1880s the school went through a period of questioning whether to focus on pedagogy (the art of teaching) and specific techniques, or to focus on a broad academic background in order to offer students a balanced education. After over two decades of debate, the current principal Richard Gause Boone chose the direction of a broader education. His decision set the direction and future for what EMU is today.

In 1889, the nearby Ypsilanti Water Tower was built. During 1890, the two oldest buildings that still remain on campus (Starkweather and Welch Hall) opened.

On October 22, 1896, Theodore Roosevelt visited the Michigan State Normal School campus.

== A new foundation ==
University Enrollment
Year	Enrollment
1853	122
1860	357*
1870	675*
1880	922*
1890	715*
1905	1,130
1910	1,452
1920	1,345
1930	2,250
1940	1,940
1950	2,601
1960	5,137
1970	21,410
1980	19,326
1990	26,000*
2000	23,181
2005	18,775
2010	23,503
*Data from 1860, 1970, 1880, 1890 and 1990 are averages or estimations based on articles.

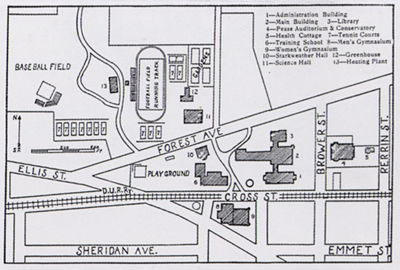
Map of MSNC in 1918

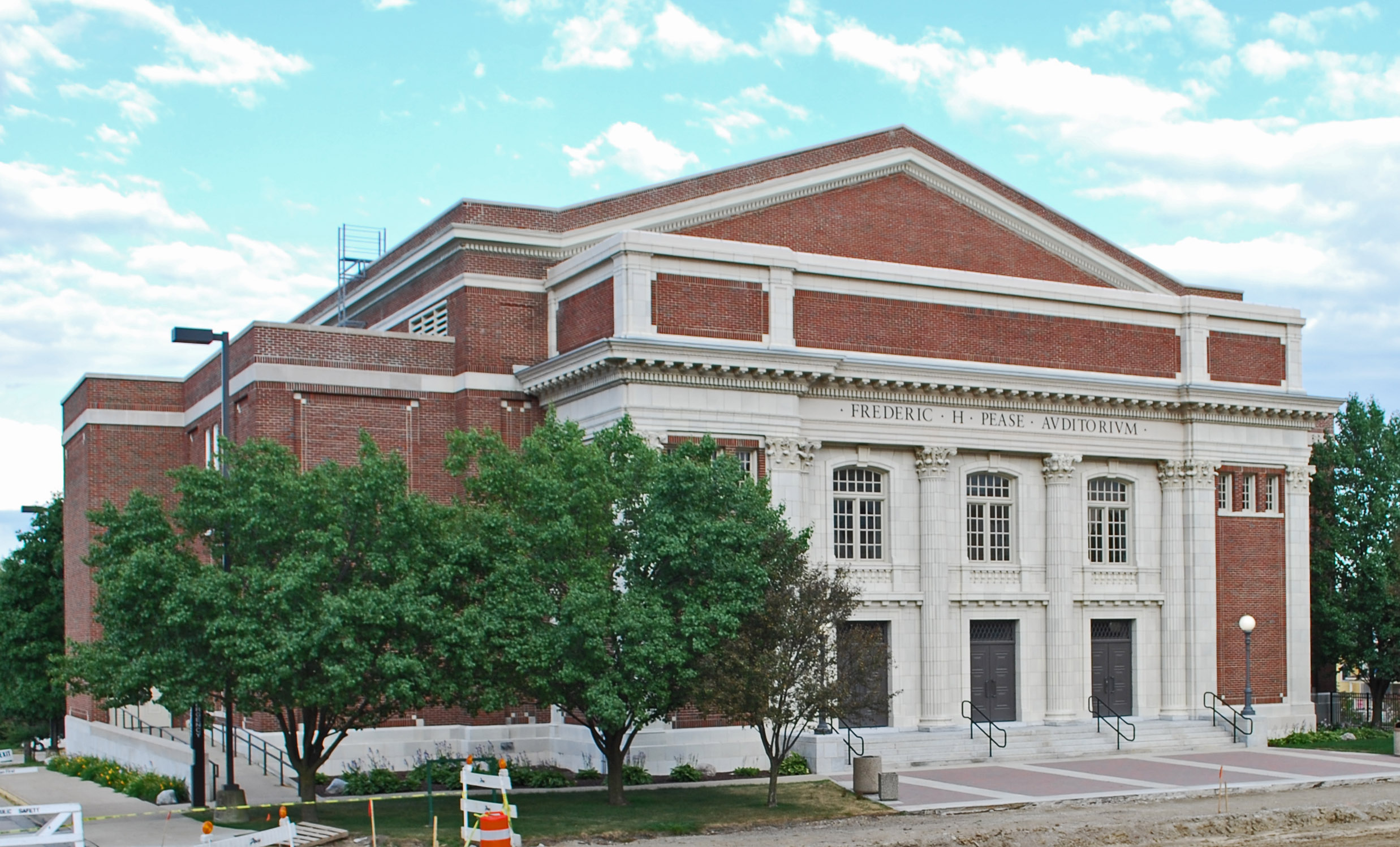
Pease Auditorium

Michigan State Normal College (1899-1955) was established under Richard Gause Boone, the principal who lobbied to establish Normal as four-year college. In 1899, the school became the Michigan State Normal College when it created the first four-year curriculum for a normal college in the nation. Around this time Alpha Sigma Tau, a national Panhellenic sorority was founded at EMU on November 4, 1899. Normal began the twentieth century as Michigan's premier teacher-preparatory school and had become the first teacher-training school in the United States to have a four-year degree program. During this time the University added ground-breaking programs.

In 1900, student athletes unofficially adopted the nickname "Normalites." Athletes wore either a "Y" for Ypsilanti or an "N" for Normal. It was not until 1929 when the school adopted the nickname "Hurons".

In 1901, Normal was the first school in Michigan to offer an industrial arts program. In 1915, it was the first program in the nation to train teachers to serve the disabled. In 1940, it was the first teacher training school to offer a program in library services. During World War II, the school trained soldiers for the military.

Between 1900 and the 1950s, around 20 buildings were built on the present-day campus. Like many other universities during World War I, the Great Depression, and World War II, the school survived and expanded further. Between 1899 and 1955 Sherzer Hall (1903), Pease Auditorium (1914), Boone Hall (1914), Roosevelt (1924), Ford (1929)McKenny Union (1930), Briggs Hall (1937), King Hall (1939), Rackham (1940), Munson Hall (1941), Hover (1941), Pierce Hall (1948), Jones Hall (1948), Brown Hall (1949), 600 W. Forest Street (the original President's House, 1950), Goddard (1955), and Bowen Field House (1955) were built. Pease Auditorium was built in 1914, the campus' first auditorium. By 1939, residence halls were established, allowing students to live on campus. The first was King Residence Hall.

In 1956 the weekly student newspaper was renamed the Eastern Echo.

== Rebirth ==
Eastern Michigan College (1956–1958) only existed for a short time. With the additions of departments and the large educational enrollment after World War II, the school became Eastern Michigan College in 1956. In a similar path, Western Michigan University, Northern Michigan University, and Central Michigan University all started as normal schools and eventually became universities. During the EMC's existence Strong Hall (1957), Buell Hall (1957), Downing Hall (1958), Snow Health Center (1959), and Quirk (1959) were built.

College/School founding
College/school	Founded
College of Arts and Sciences	1959
College of Education	1959
Graduate School	1959
College of Business	1964
College of Health and Human Services	1975
College of Technology	1980
Honors College	2005

In 1959 the school became a university, gaining the title Eastern Michigan University after establishing the Graduate School (graduate classes were offered since 1939). Eastern became a university the same year as Central Michigan University. In the same year, the College of Education, the College of Arts and Sciences, and the Graduate School were the first three colleges in the newly created university.

On the night of October 13, 1960 Senator John F. Kennedy visited Eastern Michigan University. A few hours later in the early morning of October 14, he gave a speech at the University of Michigan, challenging students to serve their country abroad in the name of peace. This was the beginning of the Peace Corps.

Several expansions in colleges followed the establishment of the university. The College of Business began in 1964, followed by the College of Human Services in 1975. The last college added was the College of Technology in 1980. Eventually the College of Human Services was renamed the College of Health and Human Services on April 21, 1982. The name change was to better reflect the various majors in the college.

More recently, extended programs were added such as Continuing Education (which includes EMU Online), the Centers for Corporate Training, the World College, and numerous community-focused institutes.

In 1972, Patricia Swan became the first African-American homecoming queen.

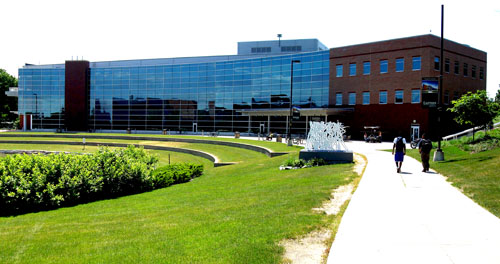
EMU Student Center

Between 1960 and 2001, apartment and residence hall expansions included Cornell Courts (Phase I-1961), Wise Hall (1964), Best Hall (1965), Phelps/Sellers(1965), Cornell Courts (Phase II-1966), Westview (Phase I-1967), Walton/Putnam (1968), Westview (Phase II-1969), and Hoyt/Pittman/Hill Halls (1969).

Between 1964 and 1999, academic, athletic, and administrative expansions included Warner Gymnasium (1964), Sill Hall (1965), Porter College of Ed. (1967), Pray-Harrold (1967), Rynearson Stadium (1968), Oestrike Baseball Stadium (1968), Mark Jefferson Science Building (1969), Alexander (1980), Olds/Robb Rec. (1982), Geddes Town Hall School (1986), Coatings Research Institute (1987), Corporate Education Center (1989) Gary Owen College of Business (1991), Pond/Lake House (1993), Terrestrial and Aquatic Research Facility (1998), the Convocation Center (1998), and the Bruce T. Halle Library (1998).

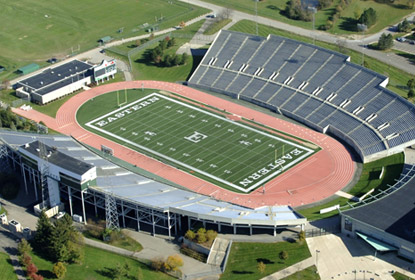
Rynearson Stadium

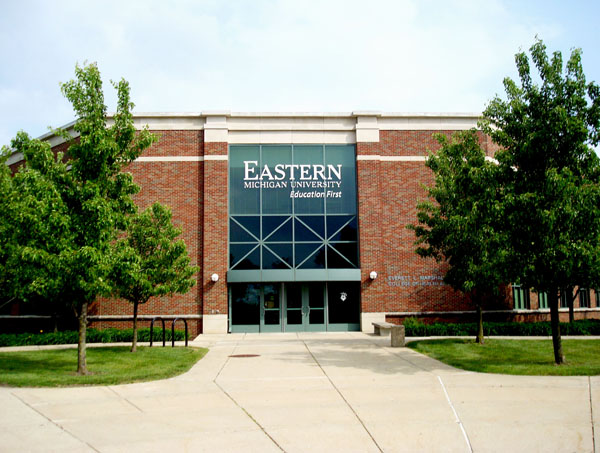
Marshall Hall

EMU began investigating the appropriateness of its Huron Indian logo after the Michigan Department of Civil Rights issued a report in October 1988 suggesting that all schools using such logos drop them. The report indicated that the use of Native American names, logos, and mascots for athletic teams promoted racial stereotypes. The EMU Board of Regents voted on May 22, 1991, to replace the Huron name with the Eagles. This was chosen from three recommendations, the other two names submitted being the Green Hornets and Express. Eventually in 1994, EMU adopted the mascot "Swoop" for the university.

On Oct. 30, 1996, President Bill Clinton visited EMU to present a speech on women in the business community, which was hosted in Bowen Field House. In May 2000, President Bill Clinton delivered the commencement address at Eastern Michigan University's Convocation Center.

Six years later, the university gained national attention when student Laura Dickinson was sexually assault and murdered on campus in her residence hall room. Orange Taylor III, also a student, was convicted of the murder. A subsequent investigation by Detroit law firm Butzel Long found that EMU had violated the Clery Act by not notifying students and named Jim Vick, Vice President of Student Affairs, as the main source of the cover-up. Several senior administrators were subsequently fired, resigned, or disciplined; among those who were fired were university president John Fallon and Vice President for Student Affairs Jim Vick. In July 2007, the U.S. Department of Education fined EMU then-record $350,000 for violating the Clery Act by not reporting the crimes to students. On December 13, 2007, EMU settled with the family and estate of Laura Dickinson for $2.5 million; the settlement does not include any admission of liability by EMU.

Major recent construction includes the Everett L. Marshall Building (2000) (which is home to the Eastern Michigan University College of Health & Human Services), University House (2003), and the Student Center (2006). A new student center opened in 2006 replacing McKenny Union (which was then renamed "McKenny Hall"). Recent changes include the McKenny Hall renovation (2007), expansion of the Science Complex in 2011 (formerly known as "Mark Jefferson Science Building"), the indoor practice facility (2010), and the renovation of Pray-Harrold classroom building (2011).

Today the university's total student population averages about 23,000, of whom 5,000 are graduate students. Most programs are undergraduate or master's level, although the university has doctoral programs in Educational Leadership, Technology, and Psychology.

EMU's first female president was Susan W. Martin, Ph.D., who took office as EMU's twenty-second president on July 7, 2008, and served until July 7, 2015.

The university's current interim president is Kim Schatzel, who took office on July 8, 2015.

== Presidents ==
EMU has had 26 presidents, which includes presidents under the school's previous names of Eastern Michigan College, Michigan State Normal School, and Michigan State Normal College. 24 men (including three interim appointments) and two women have served as president (including one interim appointments).

== Buildings ==
Today EMU is composed of more than 122 buildings across 800 acres (3.2 km^{2}) of its academic and athletic campus. It also has more than 15 residence halls and apartment complexes.

=== Historic districts ===
Established in 1984, the Eastern Michigan University Historic District is an L-shaped parcel of land on the south side of campus across Cross Street from the Ypsilanti Water Tower.

Several buildings since the university's founding have been deemed historically significant, and they were collectively listed on the National Register of Historic Places in 1984 as the "Eastern Michigan University Historic District."
