= List of presidents of Towson University =

The following is a list of principals and presidents of Towson University and its predecessor institutions:

No.	Image	Chancellor	Term start	Term end	Ref.
Principals of the Maryland State Normal School (1866–1935)
1		McFadden Alexander Newell	1866	1890	
2		E. Barrett Prettyman	1890	1905	
3		George W. Ward	1905	1909	
4		Sarah E. Richmond	1909	1917	
5		Henry S. West	1917	1920	
6		Lida Lee Tall	1920	1938	
Presidents of the Maryland State Teachers College at Towson (1935–1963)
7		M. Theresa Wiedefeld	1938	1947	
8		Earle Hawkins	1947	1969	
Presidents of the Towson State College (1963–1976)
9		James Fisher	1969	August 31, 1978 (Note: Resigned to head the Council for the Advancement and Support of Education.)	
Presidents of the Towson State University (1976–1997)
interim		Joseph Cox	September 1, 1978	June 30, 1979	
10		Hoke L. Smith	July 1, 1979	June 30, 2001	
Presidents of the Towson University (1997–present)
11		Mark L. Perkins	July 1, 2001	April 5, 2002 (Note: Forced to resigned by Board of Trustees due to excessive personal expenditures at state expense.)	
acting		Dan L. Jones	April 5, 2002	May 3, 2002	
interim		Dan L. Jones	May 3, 2002	June 30, 2003	
12		Robert L. Caret	July 1, 2003	April 19, 2011 (Note: Resigned to lead the University of Massachusetts System.)	
interim		Marcia G. Welsh	April 20, 2011	December 31, 2011	
13		Maravene Loeschke (Note: Loeschke was diagnosed with cancer in April 2014. She took a leave of absence starting in August 2014. She resigned in December 2014 and lost her fight against cancer in June 2015.)	January 1, 2012	December 19, 2014	
acting (Note: Chandler was acting president while Loeschke was on medical leave.)		Timothy J. L. Chandler	August 21, 2014	December 19, 2014	
interim		Timothy J. L. Chandler	December 19, 2014	January 24, 2016	
14		Kim Schatzel	January 25, 2016	January 31, 2023	
interim		Melanie Perreault	February 1, 2023	October 29, 2023	
15		Mark R. Ginsberg	October 30, 2023	Present	

Table notes:
