= List of presidents of Eastern Michigan University =

The following is a complete list of presidents of Eastern Michigan University. This list includes previous presidents under the school's past names Eastern Michigan College, Michigan State Normal College, and Michigan State Normal School. Prior to the Normal School's elevation to collegiate status, presidents were called "Principal."

A total of 29 people have served as the president: 27 men (including three interim appointments) and 2 women (including one interim appointment).

== List of presidents ==
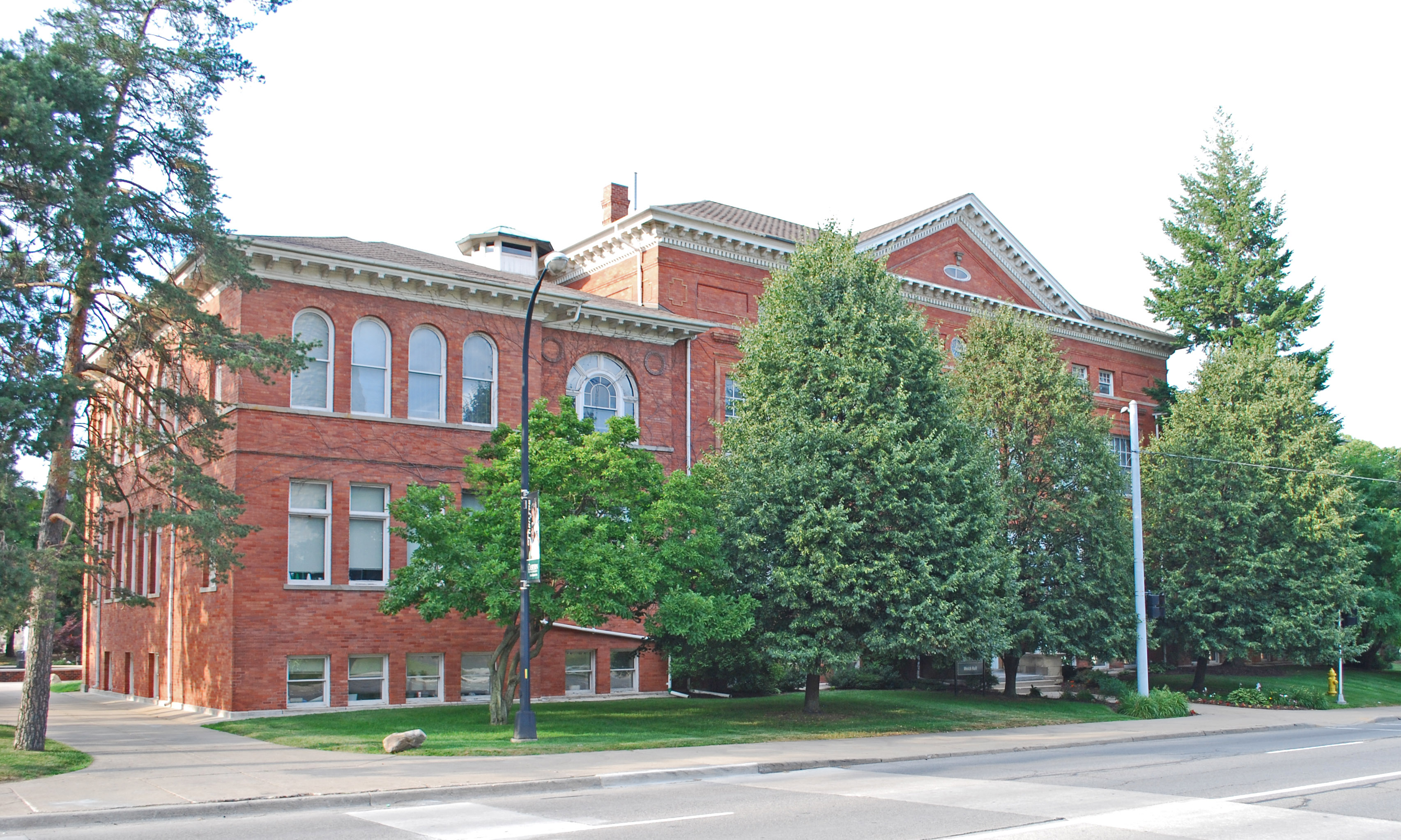
Welch Hall

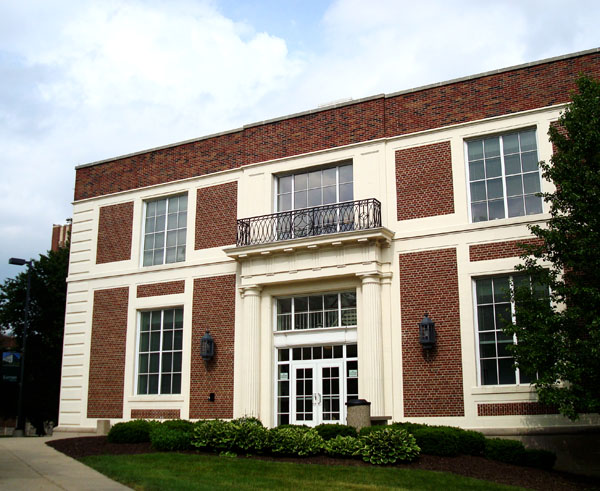
Boone Hall

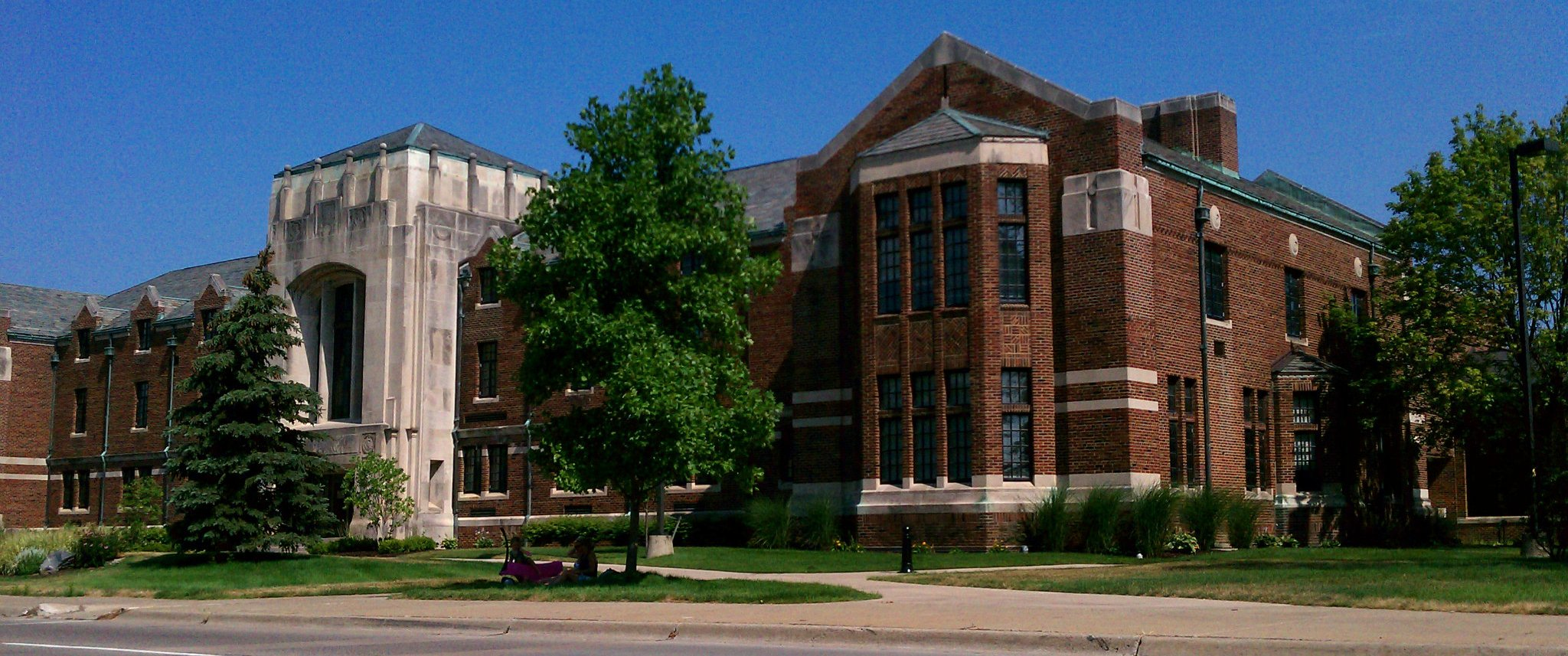
McKenny Hall

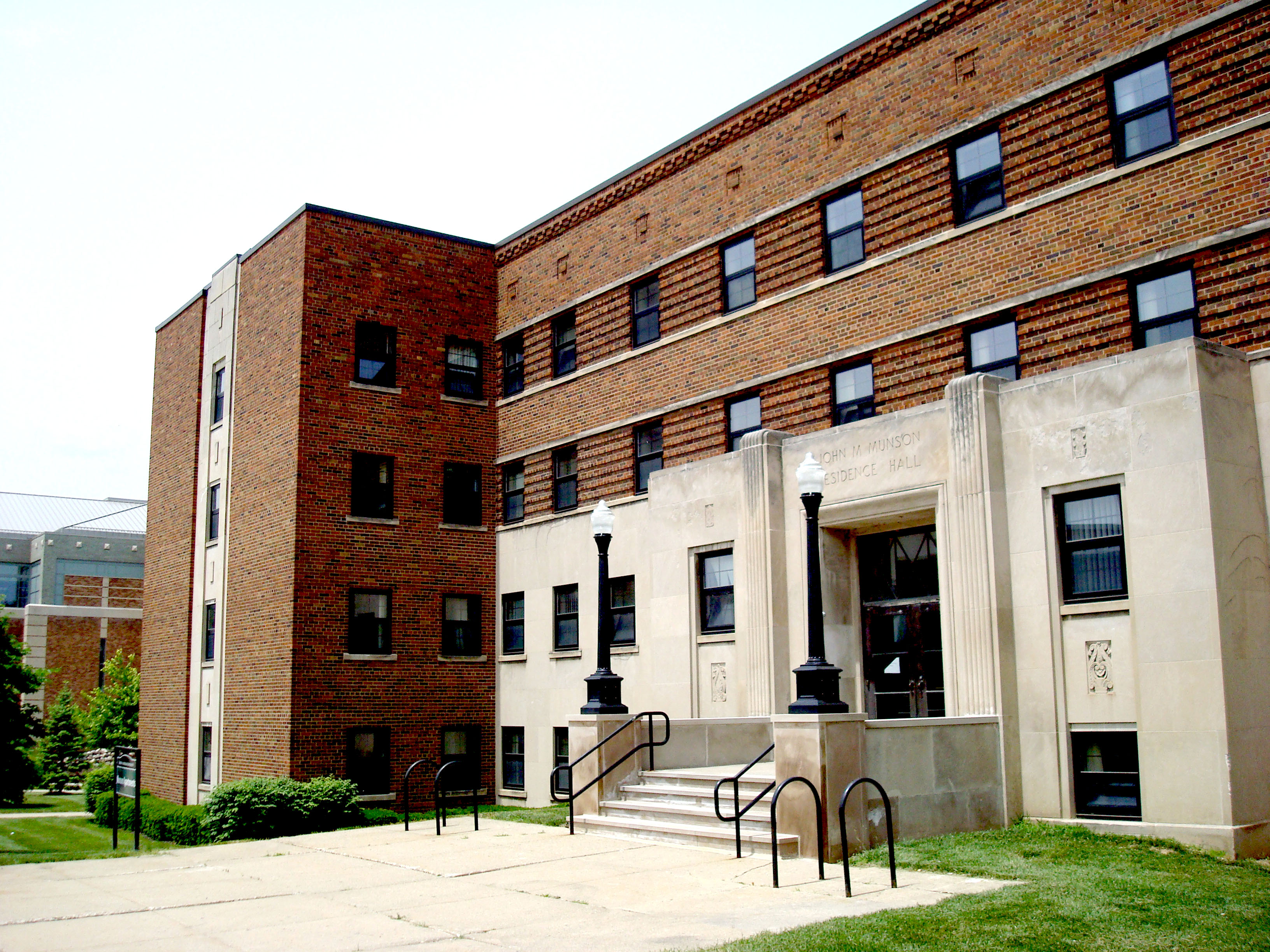
Munson Hall

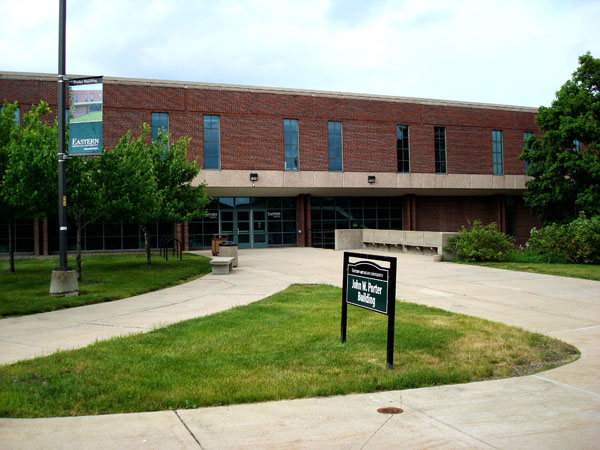
Porter Hall

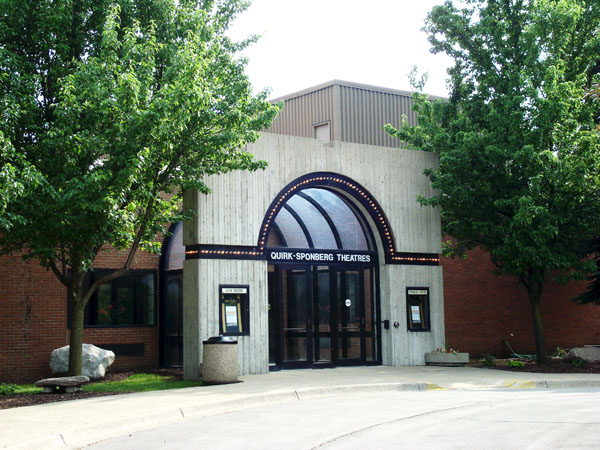
Sponberg Entrance

No.	Inst.	Full name	Start	End	Namesake(s)	Notes	Ref.
1	MSNS	Adonijah Strong Welch	1851	1865	Welch Hall, currently housing administrative offices		
2	MSNS	David Porter Mayhew	1865	1870	Parking lots Mayhew 1 & 2 near the Village and Towers are named after Mayhew		
3	MSNS	Charles FitzRoy Bellows	1870	1871			
4	MSNS	Joseph Estabrook	1871	1880			
5	MSNS	Malcolm MacVicar	1880	1881			
6	MSNS	Daniel Putnam	1880	1883	Putnam Hall, a residence hall		
7	MSNS	Edwin Willits	1883	1885			
8	MSNS	Daniel Putnam	1885	1886			
9	MSNS	John Mayhelm Barry Sill	1886	1893	Sill Hall, home to the Fine and Industrial Arts programs	Sill was a member of the first graduating class of MSNS, in 1854.	
10	MSNS	Richard Gause Boone	1893	1899	Boone Hall		
11	MSNS MSNC	Elmer A. Lyman	1900	1902			
12	MSNC	Lewis Henry Jones	1903	1911	Jones Hall, a residence hall		
13	MSNC	Charles McKenny	1912	1933	McKenny Hall, the first student union on the campus of a teachers' college		
14	MSNC	John M. Munson	1933	1948	Munson Hall, a residence hall		
15	MSNC EMC; EMU	Eugene B. Elliott	1948	1965		Elliott oversaw the transition from Michigan State Normal College to Eastern Michigan College and finally Eastern Michigan University.	
16	EMU	Harold E. Sponberg	1965	1974	Sponberg Theater		
17	EMU	Ralph Gilden	1974	1974		Interim president for six months following Sponberg's retirement.	
18	EMU	James H. Brickley	1974	1978			
19	EMU	John W. Porter	1979	1989	Porter Building, housing the College of Education		
20	EMU	William E. Shelton	1989	2000		Presided over the 1991 mascot change	
21	EMU	Samuel A. Kirkpatrick	2001	2004		Resigned under pressure after spending $6 million on a new president's house and alumni facility.	
22	EMU	Craig D. Willis	2004	2005		Served a one-year appointment as interim president	
23	EMU	John A. Fallon III	2005	2007		Fired following the Laura Dickinson murder	
24	EMU	Donald M. Loppnow	2007	2008		Served a one-year appointment as interim president	
25	EMU	Susan Martin	2008	2015		First female president of EMU.	
26	EMU	Kim Schatzel	July 8, 2015	January 7, 2016		Interim appointment	
27	EMU	Donald Loppnow	January 8, 2016	June 30, 2016		Interim appointment	
28	EMU	James M. Smith	July 1, 2016	March 31, 2026			
29		Brendan Kelly	April 1, 2026	present			
*MSNS-Michigan State Normal School; MSNC-Michigan State Normal College; EMC-Eastern Michigan College; EMU-Eastern Michigan University
