= Susan Martin =

American academic administrator

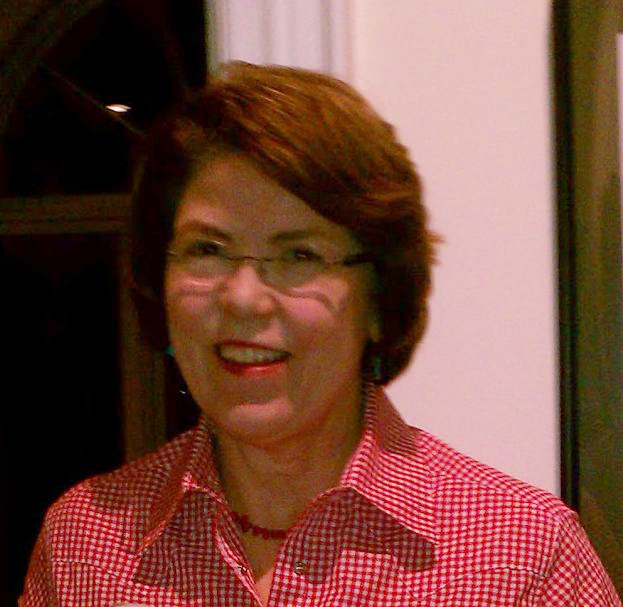
- Martin in 2012

29th President of San José State University (Interim)
- In office August 18, 2015 – July 1, 2016
- Preceded by: Mohammad Qayoumi
- Succeeded by: Mary Papazian

22nd President of Eastern Michigan University
- In office July 7, 2008 – July 7, 2015
- Preceded by: Donald M. Loppnow
- Succeeded by: Kim Schatzel

Provost & Vice-Chancellor of Academic Affairs at University of Michigan–Dearborn
- In office 2006–2008
- Preceded by: Robert Simpson
- Succeeded by: Don Bord

Personal details
- Born: Susan Work; October 24, 1950 (age 75) Croswell, Michigan, U.S.
- Spouse: Dr. Larry Martin
- Education: Central Michigan University; Michigan State University
- Profession: Professor
- Website: Eastern Michigan University: Office of the President

Susan Work Martin (born October 24, 1950) is an American academic administrator who was most recently the interim president of San José State University. Previously, Martin served as president of Eastern Michigan University in Ypsilanti, Michigan from 2008 to 2015. She was the first female president in the university’s 160-year history. She held a simultaneous appointment as Professor of Accounting in the College of Business during her tenure at Eastern.

== Early life ==
Born and raised in Croswell, Michigan, Susan Work grew up on a dairy farm and attended classes at a one-room schoolhouse with two outhouses and no running water. She received a B.S. degree in Public Speaking from Central Michigan University in 1971, before earning an M.B.A. (1976) in business administration and a Ph.D. (1988) in Accounting from Michigan State University. Martin was a member of Sigma Kappa sorority at Central Michigan University from 1967-71.

== Past Positions ==
Martin began her career as a secretary in the Department of Microbiology at the University of Texas at Austin. From there Martin moved back to Michigan working at Michigan State University and then worked in state government for four years as Assistant Auditor General. She was appointed by Michigan Governors William Milliken and James Blanchard to serve as Deputy State Treasurer for local government and by Governor Blanchard as Commissioner of Revenue.

Martin then went back to higher education working 18 years at Grand Valley State University as Master of Science in Taxation Program Coordinator; Director, International Business Programs; Chair, Accounting and Taxation Department; Professor of Accounting and Taxation; Assistant & Associate Vice President of Academic Affairs; Special Assistant to the Provost; and Executive Associate Vice President of Academic Affairs.

Lastly, before coming to Eastern, Martin served as provost & vice-chancellor of academic affairs at the University of Michigan–Dearborn from 2006-2008.

== Leadership and Public Service Activities ==
Martin has served in various positions such as Board of Directors, St. Joseph Mercy Health System; Board of Directors, Ann Arbor SPARK; Chair, State of Michigan Hospital Finance Authority, member of IRS Commissioner’s Internal Revenue Service Advisory Committee (2002–2004), Appointed member of Electronic Tax Administration Advisory Committee (1998-2000); and member of Tax Executive Committee (1997-2000)

In her first year as president of EMU, Martin attended a Harvard seminar for new university presidents and attended professional development activities every three months.

In 2012, she was selected by the Michigan Business & Professional Association for the distinguished leadership award in education during the organization’s annual Women and Leadership in Workplace Conference. That same year, under Martin’s leadership at EMU, the university was selected for the 10th consecutive year by The Princeton Review as one of the nation’s “Best in the Midwest” for tuition and education. She also oversaw Eastern’s participation in the project “Lead the Way” to train middle- and high-school teachers how to teach a rigorous STEM curriculum in Michigan Schools.

In January 2013, Martin was re-appointed to the Michigan Education Trust board of directors by Michigan Governor Rick Snyder. The 9-person committee is housed within the Michigan Department of Treasury and acts as an advisory board for the Michigan Education Savings Program, which is a tax-deferred savings and investment account available to families saving for college. This marks Martin’s second three-year term on the board. Her term expires December 31, 2015.

Martin was named co-chair of the United Way of Washtenaw County’s 2014 fundraising campaign to raise $6 million in September 2014 with Steve Dobson, retired president and CEO of Dobson-McOmber Insurance. In 2014, she was honored by the Ypsilanti/Willow Run Branch of the NAACP with the Josephine Ruffin Honorary Civil Rights Award of Distinction for her “dedicated service in education.” According to Shoshana DeMaria, the NAACP Ypsilanti/Willow Run Branch president, the award recognizes “her focus on ‘Education First,’ keeping tuition affordable, increasing enrollment and making students, families, alumni, faculty and staff feel secure, confident and empowered.”

== President of Eastern Michigan University ==
During a press conference and reception on May 14, 2008 announcing her appointment as EMU President, Martin revealed she had started the EMU Excellence Fund. As reported on Focus EMU, "Martin cast the first $10,000 and enthusiastically urged everyone present to contribute at least $1 to the fund, an action that drew applause."

On Thursday, November 20, 2008, Martin was formally inaugurated as the 22nd president of EMU in a ceremony at Pease Auditorium in front of approximately 1,000 attendees. Her initial appointment was for three years, and she received a two-year contract extension in 2010 and another two-year extension in 2013 continuing her contract through July 7, 2015. In 2014, the Eastern Michigan University Board of Regents unanimously approved another one-year extension to July 7, 2016. At the completion of her contract, her tenure makes her the longest serving president at Eastern since William Shelton who served 11 years from 1989-2000.

Although her presidency has not been without conflict, Martin has been "seen by many as a stabilizing force on the Ypsilanti campus" at a time when the university had four presidents in five years, and scandals forced her two immediate predecessors from office. Reflecting on her oversight to date, EMU has seen enrollment increases, new campus buildings and new faculty hires. When her contract was renewed in 2013, the EMU Board of Regents chairwoman Francine Parker described Martin as having the board’s full support.

Martin’s compensation was increased in 2011 by nearly $25,000, with performance bonuses of up to $17,500, which placed her salary in the mid-range of Michigan’s 15 public universities. Her renewed contract in 2013 increased her annual salary by 2.7 percent to $300,000. When her contract was renewed in 2014, the extension included a $40,000 raise, bringing her annual salary to $340,000. In several past years, Martin has returned her pay raises to support the University.

According to AnnArbor.com, "Martin's personnel file, obtained though a FOIA request, reveals that her support among the board appears to have grown from 2008 to 2011." When her contract was extended in 2010, then-Chair of the Board of Regents Roy Wilbanks said in a press release, “President Martin has led Eastern and provided EMU with a stability unmatched during this decade. It’s been a time of significant growth in terms of enrollment and facilities...despite a challenging economy.” In a December 15, 2011 review, regent Beth Fitzsimmons wrote, "For the past decade I have never seen such positive discussion about and support for EMU."

At the time of her 2014 contract extension, The Detroit News summarized her tenure as one “marked by enrollment gains, a successful fundraising campaign and several building projects...and [that] led the state in tuition restraint.”

=== Tuition Restraint ===
In Spring 2010, under the guidance of Martin, the EMU Board of Regents approved a plan to freeze tuition, room and board costs and mandatory fees for the following academic year. The initiative became known as “0,0,0” and was enacted with the goal of boosting enrollment and positively affecting the university’s revenues, offsetting a 3.1 percent education funding cut by the Michigan Legislature.

The 2010 freeze marked the first time in 30 years the university did not increase tuition costs, after the university made one of the lowest increases among Michigan’s 15 public universities with a 3.8 percent increase in 2009. That year financial aid budgets were increased by 11 percent, approved unanimously by the university’s board, to $33.7 million for the 2011-2012 school year.

A 3.65 percent increase was approved in 2011 and a 3.95 percent increase in 2012.

A 3.75 percent increase in room and board fees was approved by EMU’s regents in for the 2013-2014 academic year. The increase was said to strike a balance between affordability and the ability to continue investments in the university’s residence halls, since the university had invested $20 million over five years in its residence halls and dining areas.

In 2013, Martin testified before Lansing lawmakers to explain how the university managed to keep costs down for students in the past four years, while maintaining its ability to reinvest in academic programs and facilities. She noted that EMU’s tuition had only increased $32 per credit hour (2.86 percent) during that timeframe, the lowest among Michigan’s 15 public universities. The university also increased institutional financial aid by 78 percent from $21.4 million to $38.1 million over the previous 6 years.

Financial aid increases continued in 2014, with nearly $4 million added to the budget for the 2015-2016 school year from $44 million for the 2014-2015 school year to $48 million. The 2014-2015 allocation is an increase of 8.9 percent over the previous year’s financial aid budget. The financial aid budget will be allocated as follows: $33.5 million for undergraduate scholarships, awards and grants; $8.9 million for athletic grants-in-aid; $500,000 for federal and state matches; and more than $5 million for graduate student aid.

==== Fundraising Campaign ====
Amid tuition restraint commitments, Martin led the launch of the “largest comprehensive campaign” in Eastern’s history in April 2010, with a public phase lasting three years. The fundraising goal of the campaign, titled “Invest. Inspire. The Campaign for Eastern Michigan University,” was $50 million to fund scholarships, academic programs, faculty, facilities and endowments. At the conclusion of the campaign, the university raised $56 million.

=== Enrollment ===
When Martin took over leadership of EMU, student enrollment was at 21,972. The university saw its first enrollment increase in six years in Fall 2009, when enrollment grew by 933 students to an overall enrollment of 23,000.

In 2012, more than 5,000 undergraduates enrolled, the largest number of new students in EMU’s more than 165 year history, bringing the cumulative count to 23,502. Nearly 2,000 moved into student housing, the most in six years. The campus also experienced a more culturally diverse enrollment in 2012, with a 24 percent increase in minority students, identified as Native Americans, Hispanic and African American. Students that year also were more geographically diverse, with increases in the number of students coming from Ohio, Illinois and Indiana, among the 81 Michigan counties, 43 states and 79 countries comprising the student body.

As of 2013, enrollment increased 7 percent to 23,547 students, breaking the university’s record set in 1999 for all-time high number of incoming freshman. The university housed more than 4,000 students on campus that year, up from 3,240 in 2010 and more than they had housed since 2003. That fall, the university had more than 12,000 applications submitted. The university also saw a 28 percent increase in the number of graduating students from 2010-2013.

In 2014, EMU welcomed its third largest freshman class in a decade at 2,555 enrollees, including a record number of freshmen enrolled in the Honors College at nearly 500. To help enroll (and graduate) more first-generation and low-income minority men from the university, the Men of Color Degree Completion and Retention Plans program was announced in October 2014. The goal of the program is to improve services and processes that can help minority male students graduate and prepare students to interact with people from diverse backgrounds. The university’s minority population for the 2014-2015 school year consisted of 724 Hispanic students and 3,500 African American student of the approximately 18,000 attending.

=== Student Program Launches ===
Under Martin’s presidency, a number of new student degrees and programs were put in place at Eastern in response to new career opportunities and technological training needs.

==== Physician Assistant Program ====
In 2014, a new master’s degree program for physician assistants was launched. The Master of Science program is offered through the School of Health Promotion and Human Performance in the Eastern Michigan University College of Health and Human Services. The program became one of six accredited physician’s assistant programs in Michigan. The university partnered with nearby St. Joseph Mercy Ann Arbor hospital to provide clinical rotations for experience with real-world scenarios.

The program received 600 applications in its first year for 20 spots available. The program is scheduled to increase the number of available spots to 30 in 2015 and 40 the next year.

==== New Journalism Program ====
A new interdisciplinary journalism undergraduate degree was approved in 2014 for Fall 2015, combining courses from two existing programs: Electronic Media & Film Studies and Journalism. The program was designed to cross train students to understand and operate in both print and video reporting, while reducing redundancies for students who major in one program and minor in the other. Within the degree’s curriculum, students learn about appropriate platforms for information dissemination and how to design and produce content using multiple platforms for print, audio, video, social media and digital applications. The program provides skills-based training that incorporates critical and conceptual learning, pre-professional and practical training, community-based learning and academic service learning.

==== Entertainment Degree ====
In 2013, a new academic program for students seeking careers in the entertainment industry was approved, allowing students to major or minor in entertainment design and technology under EMU’s communications department.

==== Information Assurance Program ====
EMU launched its Information Assurance program for students in 2014, which provided education in scientific, technical and management disciplines for computer and network safety.

=== Campus Renovations ===
From 2010-2013, Martin oversaw more than $130 million invested into building renovations at EMU, this among the $210 million earmarked in a five-year revitalization of the campus.

==== Pray-Harrold Renovation ====
Martin initiated the renovation of the Pray-Harrold building in 2009, the busiest and largest (at 237,108 square feet) classroom building on Eastern’s campus, which accommodates 10,000 students and 300 faculty. The state of Michigan supplied $31.5 million of the $42 million cost of the project, which took 16 months, concluding in September 2011.

All of the offices and classrooms were moved from the building to other campus locations rather than using a phased construction plan, resulting in a $3 million dollar savings and reduced construction time.

The renovation included a glassed-in commons area, improved seating in auditoriums and classrooms, green features, upgraded mechanical and electrical systems. Fire safety systems, heating and cooling systems and data lines also were updated or replaced. The 2009-2011 renovation is the first time the building received updates since it was built in 1969, when it was the largest classroom building in Michigan.

==== EMU Science Complex ====
During Martin’s presidency, the university undertook the single largest construction project in its history. In December 2010, a $90 million science complex upgrade was unveiled, featuring a spherical planetarium suspended five stories above an open atrium area in an 80,000 square-foot laboratory, classroom and office addition to the campus’ Mark Jefferson Science Building.

The project was launched to help EMU meet national needs for educators in STEM. The addition houses several EMU departments: physics and astronomy, biology, chemistry, geography and psychology. The structure also features 36 science labs for house cell and molecular biology, biochemistry, chemical synthesis, polymer studies and surface and material studies.

The new science complex meets LEED silver certification, with a new mechanical system reduces its energy consumption and costs, a green roof and a rain garden aligning the main pedestrian pathway to help filter and detain storm water runoff.

Following the movement of faculty and classes into the new structure, renovations were initiated on the more than 40-year-old 180,000-square-foot Jefferson Building. Both projects were part of one of the university’s most active periods of construction in its history, as the Pray-Harrold classroom building renovation was in process at the same time.

The project fell under the university’s $195 million four-year capital plan. The complex was self-funded through the sale of bonds and a 4 percent tuition increase approved in 2005 for capital projects. Classes in the new science complex began in January 2011. In addition to classes being held in the facility from Monday through Thursday, the planetarium is open for use by K-12 students and teachers on Fridays and public shows are hosted on weekends.

In 2014, Martin with Board of Regents Chair Francine Parker announced the university would seek funding from the state for renovations to Strong Hall to complete the Science Complex and home to the university’s geology and geography department and physics and astronomy department. The project was delegated as the university’s top request for state cost participation for fiscal year 2016. Strong Hall was built in 1957 and as of 2014 had not received any significant updates. The cost of the project is expected to be approximately $47 million, with the state contributing 75 percent of funds and the university the other 25 percent. Funding for the project has been sought after from the state since 2010.

==== Student Advising Center ====
In 2013, a new advising center was opened in the student center to consolidate student services and inquiries, and new software was installed to help students self-manage credits for graduation. Named the Fancine Parker Advising Center, the university invested $1.5 million in adviser services and expanded its advisory staff from 12 to 18.

==== Physician’s Assistant Facilities ====
To house the university’s new physician’s assistant program, Martin invested $3.6 million in renovations to the university’s Rackham Hall, a 74-year-old building. The renovation brought mechanical systems up to date and created additional space for the program, including a suite of primary care medical office-style examination rooms equipped with cameras to evaluate student performance.

Another $1.1 million was committed toward a new Advanced Medical Simulation Center and Human Anatomy Cadaver Laboratory at St. Joseph Mercy Ann Arbor hospital.

=== Leadership Recruitment ===
In her role as president, Martin managed the addition of several high-level additions to the management team leadership.

In 2009, Walter Kraft was named vice president for communications for the university to lead media relations efforts, strategic planning and crisis management, among other communications needs. He was selected because of his background as a “leading communications executive in the region,” which included seven years as an executive vice president with a Southfield, Michigan public relations firm, following his role as a news director for WXYZ-TV in Detroit.

Gloria Hage was recruited from the University of Michigan, where she served as deputy general counsel for 18 years, to serve as general counsel in 2010 to oversee Eastern’s entire legal department and all its legal activities. She was the first new general counsel named to oversee legal affairs in 20 years.

New provost and vice president of the university Kim Schatzel was selected in 2011, effective Jan. 3, 2012 to streamline the school’s advising system and increase exposure to EMU’s graduate programs, among other leadership roles. She was selected for her background as a business manager and entrepreneurial spirit and her experience in building strategic academic programs based upon student, employer and state needs.

Rob Murphy was recruited from Syracuse University to head the men’s basketball team in 2011. He was selected for a successful tenure at Syracuse, being part of a 180-67 overall record, and his ability to recruit talented players.

Robert Heighes was named police chief for EMU in April 2012, after serving as interim police chief following the death of Police Chief Greg O’Dell in December 2012. His selection was based upon his 28 years of service to the department and his role as interim chief in three separate terms.

Martin’s “enthusiasm for athletics...and understanding...of the value of it to a university” led to the hiring of Heather Lyke as EMU’s athletic director and vice president in 2013 on a five-year contract. She is the first female to hold the position at Eastern and one of only six female athletic directors in the NCAA Division I athletics. She was chosen for her 15 years of experience as associate director at Ohio State University.

To serve as program director for the university’s new Physician’s Assistant master’s degree program, Jay Peterson was hired in May 2014. He was selected for his experience as a teacher of a similar program at the University of Toledo and his service as a physician’s assistant in practices at Oakwood Hospital in Dearborn, Michigan.

Also in 2014, Michael Valdes was announced as the new chief financial officer for EMU in 2014. He is responsible for oversight of the Office of the Controller, the Budget Office, Student Business Services, the Purchasing Department and Business Systems Support. His experience is drawn from four years as CFO for Agility Health, Inc. in Grand Rapids, Michigan and his work for University of Michigan Hospitals and Health Centers.

David Turner was added as the vice president of university human resources in 2014, a newly created position. In the position, Turner was charged with consolidating functions and increasing the responsiveness of HR. He was selected for his experience in HR with Oak Park Public Schools, Detroit Public Schools and MGM Grand Detroit.

Calvin Phillips was named to associate vice president of student affairs, recruited from Northern State University in Aberdeen, South Dakota. The position oversees non-academic and co-curricular student experiences, including residential life and housing, student well-being, new student orientation and campus life, student conduct, international student services, diversity and community involvement and the Children’s Institute.

A new executive director of government and community relations, Ken Dobson, was named in September 2014 to help advance EMU’s priorities at local, state and federal levels. He was selected for his more than 17 years of experience in legislative, public policy, community relations and governments affairs for both public and private entities.

=== Public Safety Awareness ===
Soon after joining in EMU, Martin worked with then-Police Chief Greg O’Dell to develop new protocols to stay informed about any safety issues on campus, including making herself available for late-night calls to be briefed on campus incidents.

She authorized the addition of three officers to the crime response unit to help prevent and solve crimes at EMU, despite limited resources and budgets. The university experienced a drop in crime rates soon after.

She initiated the Hoyt Conference Center remodeling to serve as the new Department of Public Safety headquarters, located at the northwest end of Eastern’s campus, for $3.9 million. A Crime Response Unit was created to work on crimes in the area, resulting in a 31 percent decrease in campus burglaries and a 59 percent decrease in residence hall burglaries from 2009-2011.

In 2012, Martin approved the investment of $78,000 of the university’s 2012-2013 contingency fund to upgrade the campus’ 42 blue light emergency phones after an unarmed robbery incident outside of the Warner Building in August 2011. At that time, the university reassessed the equipment and its maintenance and worked to improve its safety infrastructure and enhance its equipment. New software was installed to the emergency phone system to allow campus police to regularly send test signals to each the 42 phones to ensure each is operational from its headquarters and protocols were established for weekly physical checks.

Led by Martin, the university announced in 2014 an investment of more than $1.7 million in safety and security updates for the following fiscal year, including 10 additional police officers, expanding the number of surveillance cameras beyond the 500 already in place, increasing campus perimeter lighting and renovating police headquarters to make room for new officers. It also was announced that the university would participate in the newly formed Eastern Washtenaw Safety Alliance law enforcement alliance. The collaboration is among EMU, Washtenaw County, the city of Ypsilanti and Ypsilanti Township as a response to prevent violent crimes and features new safety measures and shared jurisdictional authority.

=== Community Support Programs ===
==== Autism Collaborative Center ====
An Autism Collaborative Center was opened at EMU in 2009 for autistic children, teenagers, adults and their families in the Fletcher School Building. The building was purchased from Ypsilanti Public Schools in 2009 for $2.2 million, with the help of an anonymous donation of $1.2 million to supplement the purchase, renovations and first year of operation.

The center was developed to address the gap in services and resources for adults and teenagers with autism from those available to children. In addition to programming, research is conducted at the center to help determine effective interventions and treatments for autism spectrum disorders. The center is a nonprofit, where paid clinicians assess and provide treatment services. Resources include: support groups, educational workshops, child care and counseling, occupational therapy, speech and language therapy, recreational therapy, music therapy, social work services, counseling, diagnostic services, psychology, academic tutoring, therapeutic social skills, play groups and summer camp opportunities.

Undergraduate and graduate students from nine disciplines at EMU also use the facility for education and training in dietetics and nutrition, nursing, special education, music therapy, occupational therapy, psychology, therapeutic recreation, social work and speech and language therapy.

In 2012, the ACC was awarded a $500,000 grant from the state of Michigan, which was used to fund Applied Behavior Analysis.

==== Digital Inclusion Store ====
Eastern Michigan University, through The Business Side of Youth program Digital Inclusion partnered with Wireless Ypsi to implement free wireless Internet for two low-income Ypsilanti housing developments, Hollow Creek and Paradise Manor, in 2012.

A new location for The Digital Inclusion store, known as DI, was launched in November 2013, providing computer hardware and software training and operated by the Business Side of Youth, which seeks to reduce the technology gap in low income areas of Washtenaw county.

DI has three main goals: to provide low-cost technology to the community and teach them how to use it, youth training to repair and refurbish technology and training experience for students. Refurbished computers are sold or donated to low-income families.

==== Live Ypsi Home Buying Assistance Program ====
The Live Ypsi Home Buying Assistance Program, funded by the university, Washtenaw County and the DTE Foundation was launched in 2012 and renewed for a second year in 2013. Full-time Eastern Michigan University employees were offered a forgivable loan of $7,500 to assist in purchasing a home in Ypsilanti. Employees were forgiven 20 percent of the loan for each year they lived in the house and worked at EMU. The loan was fully forgiven after 5 years.

==== Hamilton Crossing Family Empowerment Program ====
Eastern oversaw the renovation of Hamilton Crossing, an impoverished neighborhood on the south side of Ypsilanti comprising 144 housing units, providing life skills training to area residents with the help of a grant from the Kresge Foundation.

The University also launched the Family Empowerment Program, which serves as a resource based support system for the residents of the low-income units to restructure their lives to improve the outlook for themselves and their families. The mandatory program provides assistance to 200 adults and children who live in the 70 subsidized units of the complex. The university hired a licensed social worker to direct the program, and undergraduate and graduate social work students support the program’s operations and services.

The FEP helps residents achieve at their jobs (more than 70 percent of the residents in subsidized housing are employed), improve their education and in work their way toward the purchase of a home. Funding, in the amount of $250,000, came from the Kresge Foundation’s Human Services Program to EMU to operate the FEP.

Residents are offered community activities and free Internet access. A mix of market-rate and subsidized housing, low-income residents are offered reduced rates on a sliding scale based upon income. The FEP also developed partnerships with local organizations to assist residents in registering eligible children for a Head Start Program and other no-fee preschool resources.

The program also offers an Individual Savings Account program for residents to build finances for education, housing or a small business venture. The program offers a 2-1 match and is funded by federal dollars and a partnership with Washtenaw Federal Credit Union.

In a 2014 survey of results of the program showed that residents who lived at Hamilton Crossing for at least one year: saw less crime than in their previous residences, increased their hours worked per week, had better access to primary health care, exhibited less frequency of emergency rooms visits, demonstrated increased confidence in using computer technology and were more interested in developing a savings plan. The program was awarded the Charles L. Edson Tax Credit Excellence Award in 2014.

=== Athletics Development ===
Martin has been a strong advocate of Eastern’s athletic program, its position as a Division I school and determining how to make the program competitive. She hired Heather Lyke as EMU’s athletic director and vice president in 2013 to reinvigorate the program, represent athletics as part of the academic community and integrate the athletic department into the university community. She is tasked with evaluating their teams and putting in place appropriate leadership to create winning teams to attract more fans to Eastern games, among other athletic department roles.

In March 2013, Eastern Michigan University’s athletic department received its NCAA certification. Recertification occurs every 10 years, following a rigorous year-long self-study involving more than 50 people and focused on governance and commitment to: rules and compliance, academic integrity, gender equity, diversity and student athlete well-being. At the time of the announcement, EMU’s 21 varsity teams had a cumulative grade point average of 3.201 for the fall 2012 semester, the highest in the school’s history.

=== 2012 Reprimand ===
On April 23, 2012, Martin, along with four EMU regents (Roy Wilbanks, Jim Stapleton, Floyd Clack and Beth Fitzsimmons), were in Washington, D.C. attending an Association of Governing Boards of Universities and Colleges conference. Following the conference they attended an alumni reception, after which Martin met at a bar with Michael Ferens, an EMU alumnus and the president of the Washington, D.C. alumni chapter, as well as an unidentified board member from the Washington, D.C. alumni chapter, and an unidentified EMU staff member.

The exact details of the discussion are unclear, but they discussed EMU's 1991 mascot change and the "Huron Restoration" chapter of the alumni association, previous plans for a Huron statue, and John A. Fallon and Samuel A. Kirkpatrick, Martin's predecessors as president, both of whom left amidst controversy.

According to emails they exchanged the next day, in which they apologized to each other, Martin thought Ferens said "John Fallon is my man"—a comment to which she was sensitive because Fallon had recently been hired by Ball State University, bringing the Laura Dickinson murder back into the news—while Ferens did not think he had said that and indicated that if he had, it had been a slip of the tongue.

Martin subsequently described the incident, saying "I lost my temper with an alumni [sic] when our discussion turned to a particularly sad time in Eastern's history. As it turned out, we had misunderstood each other at the time and we apologized to each other in subsequent emails the next day for this misunderstanding."

According to Ferens, "I mis-phrased a name in the conversation and that’s all it really was." Ferens subsequently characterized the issue as "a little miscommunication" and "a moment of intensity in a conversation" about the mascot change. Martin acknowledged that she "was drinking at the time that I lost my temper" and mentioned that she hadn't eaten, while Ferens stated, "We sat down and had a glass of wine, but we didn’t have 15 glasses of wine. I did not witness any heavy drinking. I did not witness any spectacles."

In response to the incident the EMU Board of Regents officially reprimanded Martin on May 17:

We want you to be successful as the President of the University. It is, however, incumbent upon us to emphasize the severity of the incident and its potential impact as your role as a leader and symbol of the University. You must deal with this issue immediately. If there are any further incidents, you will leave us no alternative but to recommend to the board that your employment be terminated for just cause pursuant to Paragraph 16.1 of your employment agreement.

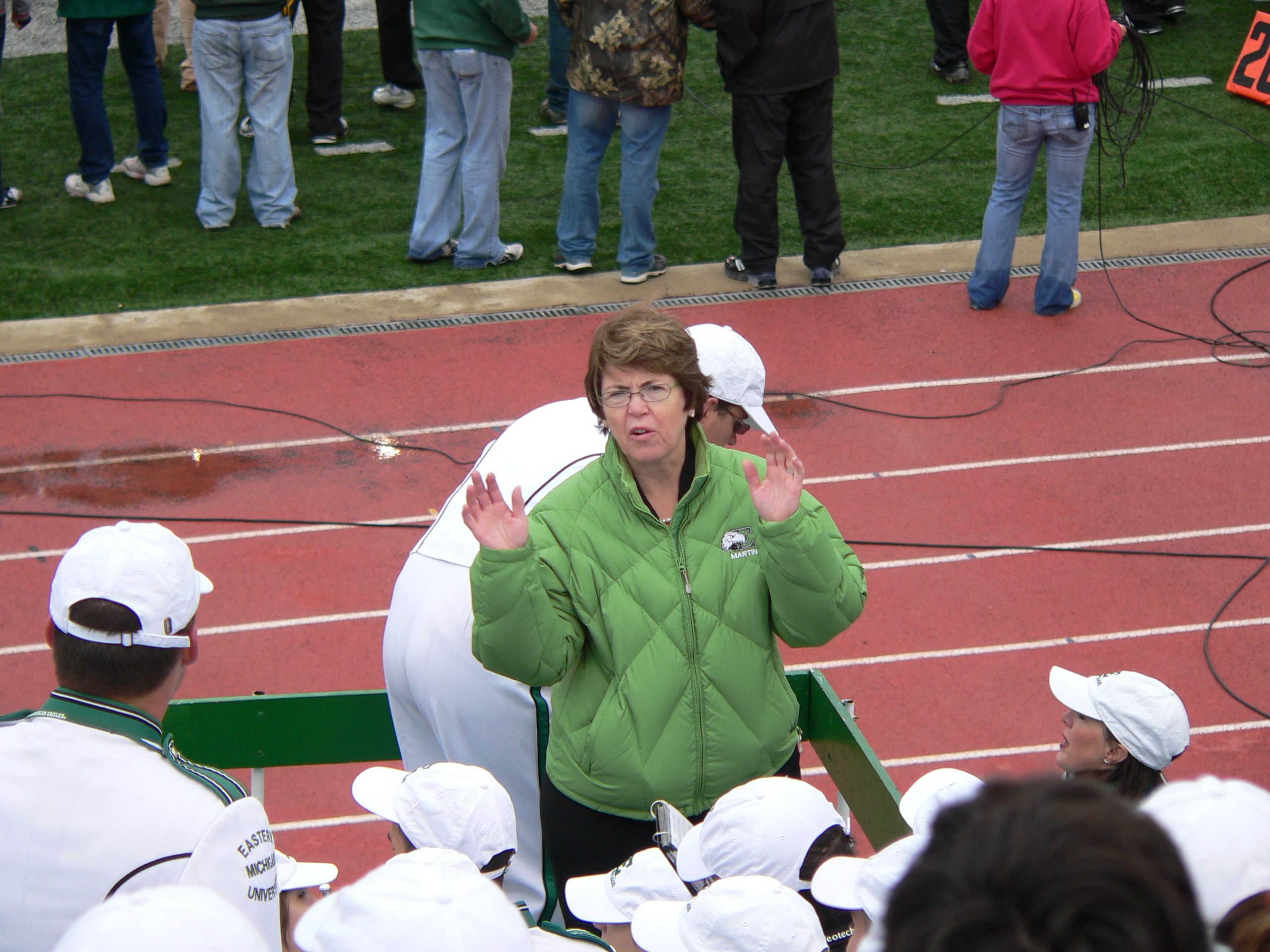
Martin on the marching band platform at a 2010 football game

In a formal response to the Board of Regents, Martin defended her character:

I consider myself a 'hands-on' President even to the point of jumping onto the marching band platform when appropriate, rappelling 60 feet down Roosevelt Hall, being on call 24/7 with the Department of Public Safety and insisting on being informed about every serious incident on campus. I could not perform these duties and handle the rigors of this position if I had a serious health issue of any type as suggested by the May 17, letter. I will continue to devote my entire time and energy to the goals and metrics we have set to make Eastern thrive and grow. I am deeply committed to this University. I love Eastern and "bleed green".

Following the 2012 incident, Martin stated that although she did not believe she had an alcohol problem, she would receive counseling as recommended by the Board of Regents. She also announced she would donate her 2012 raise, $8,764, to on-campus alcohol education.

== President of San Jose State University ==
On July 16, 2015, California State University chancellor Timothy P. White hired Martin to serve as interim president of San Jose State University following the resignation of Mohammad Qayoumi. Martin will assume her duties on August 18, 2015, while the university system conducts a national search for a long-term successor to Qayoumi.

== Recent Publications ==
Bruce Bublitz, Susan Martin; "The Incorporation of Managerial Accounting Concepts into Governmental Organizations: The Case of Public Universities", Journal of Governmental Financial Management, Winter 2007, Vol 56, No. 4, pp. 48–62

“Low Supply and High Demand for USA Accounting graduates due to Enron and Sarbanes-Oxley Act”, IV International Scientific Conference, Accounting and Control Development in Context of European Integration, May 19–20, 2005, Kramatorsk, Ukraine.

== Certifications ==
- Certified Public Accountant, November 1978
- Certified Management Accountant, October 1979
- Certified Internal Auditor, September 1979
- Certified Government Financial Manager, November 1996

Academic offices
Preceded by Mohammad Qayoumi	Interim President of San José State University; 2015-2016	Succeeded by Mary Papazian
Preceded by Donald M. Loppnow	President of Eastern Michigan University; 2008-2015	Succeeded by Kim Schatzel
Preceded by Robert Simpson	Provost & Vice-Chancellor of Academic Affairs at University of Michigan–Dearborn; 2006-2008	Succeeded by Don Bord
