= Jack M. Wilson =

American educator and entrepreneur (born 1945)

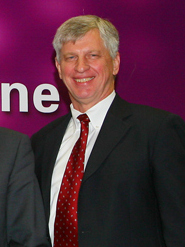
- Wilson in 2007

President of the University of Massachusetts
- In office 2003–2011
- Preceded by: William Bulger
- Succeeded by: Robert Caret

Personal details
- Born: 1945 (age 80–81) Indiana, United States
- Children: 4
- Occupation: President-Emeritus and Distinguished Professor of Higher Education, Emerging Technologies, and Innovation, entrepreneur, educator

Jack M. Wilson (born 1945) is an American educator, entrepreneur and the President-Emeritus and Distinguished Professor of Higher Education, Emerging Technologies, and Innovation at the University of Massachusetts Lowell. During his career, he has served various institutions as professor of physics, department chair, research center director, dean, provost, vice president, and president, and has served with multiple professional societies and government committees.

== Education and early life ==
Wilson earned his bachelor's degree at Thiel College in 1967. His master's degree (1970) and doctorate (1972) in physics were both earned from Kent State University. In 2004 Wilson received an honorary doctorate degree from Thiel College.

== Career ==
=== Professor and administrator ===
Wilson began his professional career in physics as an instructor at Kent State University in Ohio. He then moved to the physics department at Sam Houston State University in Texas. In his ten years there (1972–82) he was first professor, then department chair, and eventually director of their Division of Chemistry, Physics, and Physical Sciences.

After two years as guest scientist at the State University of New York at Stony Brook (1982–84) and Executive Officer of the American Association of Physics Teachers (AAPT), Wilson moved to the University of Maryland. From 1984 to 1990, he was a professor of physics at the University of Maryland's main campus and continued as the Executive Officer of AAPT. He also served as Co-Director of the Maryland University Project in Physics and Educational Technology.

In January 1990, Wilson resigned from AAPT and went to Rensselaer Polytechnic Institute in New York, as director of the Lois J. and Harlan E. Anderson Center for Innovation in Undergraduate Education and Professor of Physics. In 1997 he was appointed as the J. Erik Jonsson '22 Distinguished Professor of Physics, Engineering Science, Information Technology, and Management at RPI, a capacity he held until 2001. He also served RPI as a Dean, Research Center Director, and interim Provost. He was also chairman of the board for RPI's extension campus, Rensselaer at Hartford.

==== University of Massachusetts ====
===== UMassOnline =====
Wilson founded UMassOnline in 2001, which enables students to earn accredited degrees online from the UMass system. From 2001 to 2003, he served as CEO. As the CEO of UMassOnline, he helped to build the system-wide initiative into one of the largest externally directed online programs in the United States, with 64 graduate and undergraduate degree and certificate programs serving more than 64,000 enrollees in 2014 with revenues of over $85 million for the university. For his work in "advancing the quality and scale of online and blended education", he was named to the Online Learning Consortiums (OLC) 2015 class of fellows.

===== University president =====
At the University of Massachusetts, he first served as the Vice President for Academic Affairs in 2003.

Wilson served as the 25th President of the University of Massachusetts system, from 2003 to 2011, overseeing their five campuses and 60,000 students. Wilson is now the President Emeritus of the UMass system.

At the University of Massachusetts, Wilson called for a rededication to the land grant mission as it might be viewed in the context of a modern innovative society. He believed that UMass played a critical role in Massachusetts, saying "The path to economic and social development in Massachusetts goes through the University of Massachusetts."

Wilson believed that financial aid is the key to affordability and accessibility. He increased financial aid by 267% during his eight-year term at a time when financial aid from other sources was not growing substantially. He also established a scholarship fund with the proceeds of an insurance policy; at the time of his retirement as president in 2011, additional donations had brought the total fund to $2.1 million.

Recognizing that the university needed investment in infrastructure, he restructured the UMass Building Authority and launched a building program. UMass made $1.6 billion in capital investments in the first five years of his presidential term and established a capital program of $2.9 billion more to be carried out over the next decade.

He created Presidential grant programs to encourage the growth of research and the creative economy. During his eight years as president, research at the university increased by 69% and the commercialization of the intellectual property generated by that research increased by 105%. This put UMass at eighth in the nation at the time of his departure in 2011, according to the ranking of the Association of University Technology Managers. Wilson also established international programs as a major priority and recruited the first Vice President to carry the title "International Relations" as part of her title. He identified Africa, Japan, China, Germany, India, and the Portuguese language countries as particular first targets of opportunity, building on existing relationships of the university and his own work.

===== Other UMass initiatives =====
He served as the Founding Chair of the Massachusetts Green High Performance Computing Center. The Center is a joint venture among UMass, MIT, Harvard, Boston University, and Northeastern with support from EMC, Cisco, Accenture, and other companies.

During the academic year 2012–13, he served as the interim Dean of Engineering at UMass Lowell. He continues at UMass Lowell as University Distinguished Professor of Higher Education, Innovation, and Emerging Technologies.

=== Entrepreneur ===
In the private sector, Wilson was the founder, CEO, and Chairman of the LearnLinc Corporation, founded in 1993 as a spin-off of his university research. After several mergers he formed the publicly traded Mentergy Corporation, leaving the company in the next year. Following the formation of Mentergy through a triple reverse merger with Gilat Communications, John Bryce Training and Allen Communications in early 2001, the company's market value on NASDAQ was around $500 million.

He has served as a consultant to many computing and communications firms. Clients include IBM, AT&T, Lucent, Hewlett Packard, and Boeing Flight Safety International.

Wilson's expertise in building links between higher education, government, and business led to co-founding RPI's Severino Center for Technological Entrepreneurship as well as other programs.

== Further affiliations ==
From 1982 to 1990, Wilson served as the head of the American Association of Physics Teachers, a scientific society in Washington, DC. He also served as an officer of the American Institute of Physics and the Chairman of the American Physical Society, and is a Fellow of both.

He was appointed to the U.S. Education Commission of the States in 2005 by Massachusetts Governor Mitt Romney and then reappointed in 2010 by Governor Deval Patrick. In 2011, the FBI honored him for his service on the National Security Higher Education Advisory Board.

He has also served as a member or chair of several study committees and task forces for the National Academy of Sciences and the Academy's National Research Council.

He also served on the Edward M. Kennedy Institute for the United States Senate. He was a member of the Board of Directors and then was interim President from 2011 to 2012.

He served as the Chair of the US Department of Education Fund for the Improvement of Post-Secondary Education (FIPSE) Advisory Board from 2010 to 2014.

He is presently serving on the board of the Advanced Cyber Security Center.

He chairs the Investment Advisory Committee of the Innovation Institute for the Massachusetts Technology Collaborative.

== Awards ==
Wilson has won multiple awards for his leadership in the reform of higher education programs and his innovative programs.

- TIAA–CREF: Theodore Hesburgh Award for Innovation in Undergraduate Education, 1995
- Boeing Corporation: The Boeing Outstanding Educator Award, 1995
- The Pew Charitable Trusts: The Pew Charitable Trust Award for Outstanding Achievement in Undergraduate Education, 1996
- United States Army: Outstanding Civilian Service Medal for service to the Army Education program, 2001
- Massachusetts Alliance for Economic Development: Statewide Strategic Asset award, 2004
- Mass High Tech Magazine: Massachusetts All Star, 2005
- Knox Trail Council of the Boy Scouts of America: Westborough Good Scout Award, November 2010
- Massachusetts Technology Leadership Council: Workforce Development Leader of the Year, 2010
- FBI/Department of Justice: Exceptional Service in the Public Interest, 2011

== Personal life ==
Wilson lives in Bradenton, Florida. He is married, the father of four children, and grandfather of five.

Academic offices
| Preceded by William Bulger | President of the University of Massachusetts; 2003 - 2011 | Succeeded by Robert Caret |
