= Kim Schatzel =

American academic administrator and business executive

Kim E. Schatzel
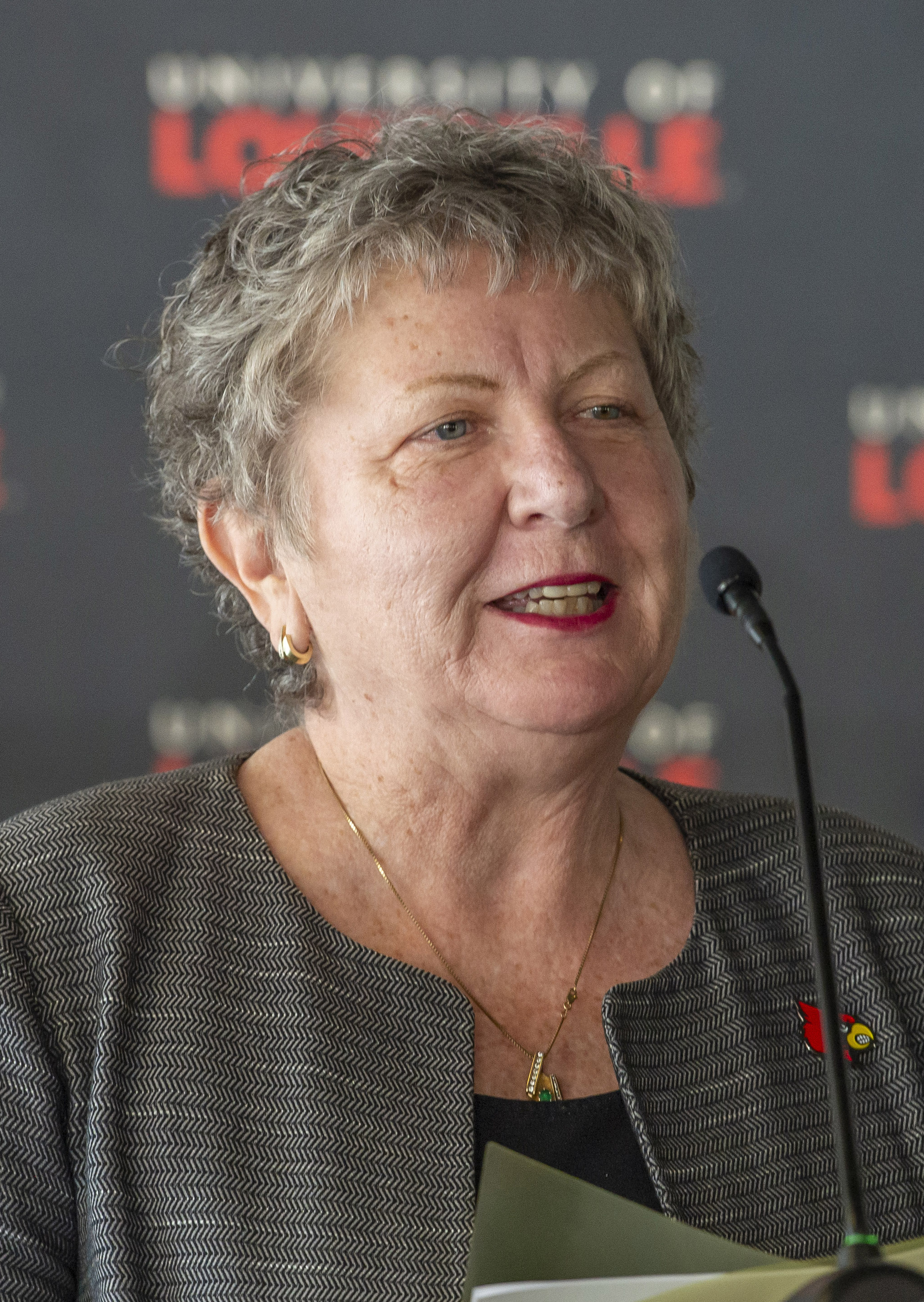
- Schatzel in 2023

19th President of the University of Louisville
- In office February 1, 2023 – March 26, 2025
- Preceded by: Lori Stewart Gonzalez (interim)
- Succeeded by: Gerry Bradley

14th President of Towson University
- In office January 25, 2016 – January 31, 2023
- Preceded by: Maravene Loeschke
- Succeeded by: Melanie Perreault (interim)

Interim President of Eastern Michigan University
- In office July 8, 2015 – January 7, 2016
- Preceded by: Susan Martin
- Succeeded by: Donald Loppnow (interim)

Provost and Executive Vice President of Eastern Michigan University
- In office January 3, 2012 – January 7, 2016
- Preceded by: Jack Kay
- Succeeded by: Rhonda Longworth (interim)

Dean of the College of Business at University of Michigan–Dearborn
- In office 2008–2011
- Succeeded by: Raju Balakrishnan

Personal details
- Spouse: Trevor Iles
- Children: 2
- Education: Washington University in St. Louis; Michigan State University
- Website: Office of the President

Kim E. Schatzel is an American academic administrator who was the 19th president of the University of Louisville. She joined Eastern Michigan University in January 2012 as provost and executive vice president of academic and student affairs, and became interim president on July 8, 2015, following the resignation of Susan Martin. Schatzel was previously dean of the college of business at University of Michigan–Dearborn. On November 30, 2022, she was announced as the next president of University of Louisville and began her tenure on February 1, 2023. She resigned as president of the University of Louisville on March 26, 2025.

== Corporate career ==
Schatzel spent more than 20 years working in new ventures and start-up ventures. She began her career working as a foreperson at a Ford Pinto manufacturing plant. Her roles later ranged from being a top-level manager of an automobile parts manufacturer to being CEO of ICM/Krebsoge.

She was appointed to the board of directors of Health Alliance Plan in February 2013 and is chair of its audit committee, as well as the audit and finance committee for Henry Ford Health System.

== Academic career ==
Schatzel was an assistant professor at Boston College from 1999 until she started working at University of Michigan–Dearborn in 2000 as an assistant professor of marketing. She held numerous positions until becoming dean of the college of business in 2008.

She was a professor of marketing at the University of Michigan's Ross School of Business, and received the university's Distinguished Faculty Teaching Award in 2006.

On January 3, 2012, she started at Eastern Michigan University as provost and executive vice president of academic and student affairs.

On July 8, 2015, Schatzel became interim president, following the resignation of the previous president, Susan Martin. She retained her position as provost while serving as the interim. On December 4, 2015, Towson University selected her as their next president; her last day was January 7, 2016. She began her tenure on January 25, 2016.

Her research and teaching focuses on product innovation, new product introductions, and marketing communications.

== Personal life ==
Schatzel received a bachelor's degree in economics and biology from Washington University in St. Louis in 1978. She received a doctorate in business administration from Michigan State University's Eli Broad Graduate School of Management in 1999.

She lives with her husband, Trevor Iles, a businessman and has two children.
