= Melanie Perreault =

American historian and academic administrator

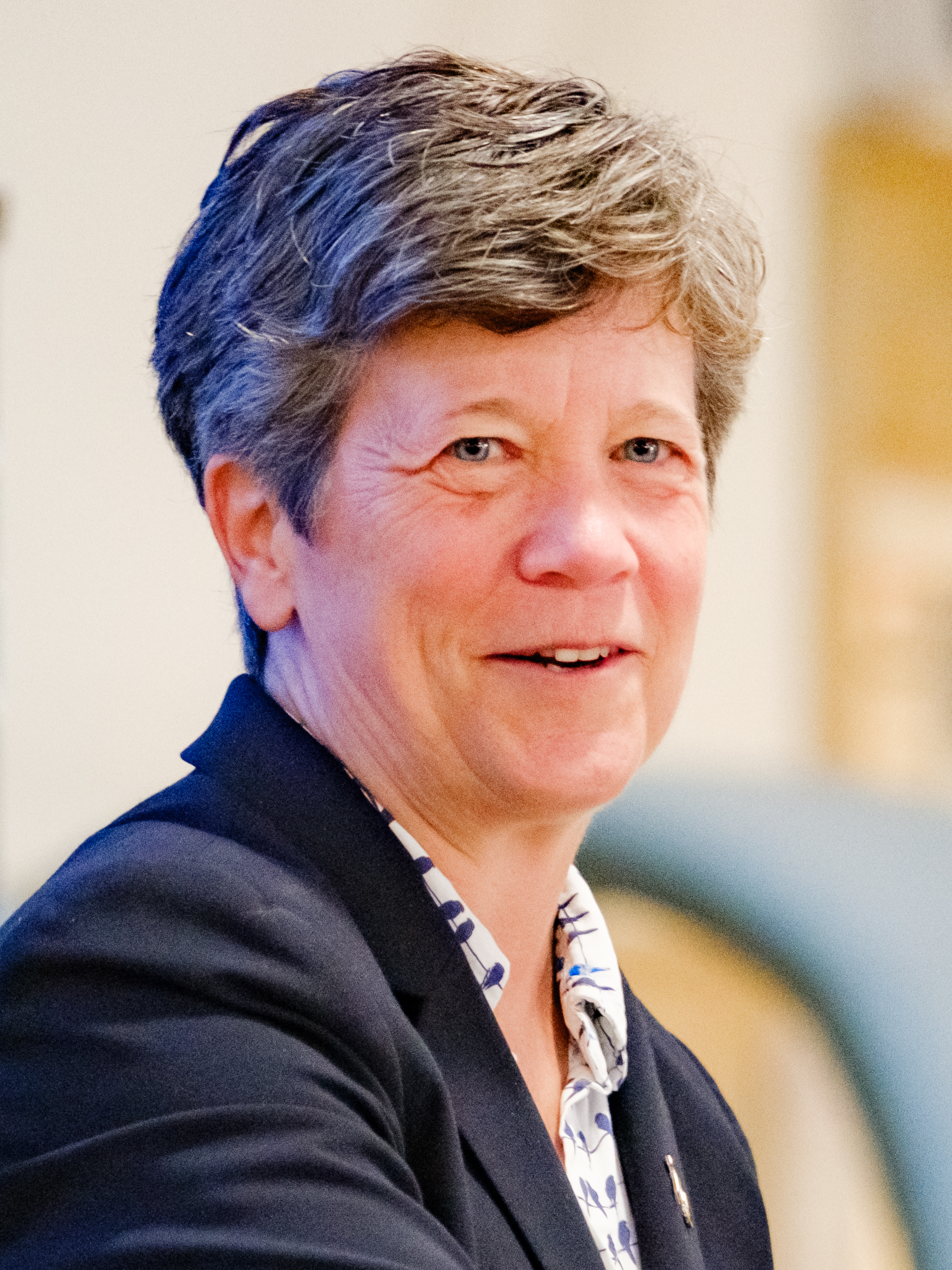
- Perreault in 2023

Provost and Executive Vice President Towson University
- Incumbent
- Assumed office February 1, 2019

Personal details
- Born: Melanie Lynn Perreault; August 2, 1968 (age 58) Baltimore, Maryland, U.S.
- Education: Lawrence University; College of William & Mary

Melanie Lynn Perreault (born August 2, 1968) is an American historian and academic administrator serving as the provost of Towson University since 2019. She was its interim president in 2023.

== Life ==
Melanie Lynn Perreault was born in Baltimore on August 2, 1968. She earned a B.A., magna cum laude, in history from Lawrence University in 1990. She was inducted into Phi Beta Kappa. Perreault earned a Ph.D. in colonial American history from the College of William & Mary in 1997. Her dissertation was titled, First contact: Early English encounters with natives of Russia, West Africa, and the Americas, 1530-1614. James Axtell served as Perreault's doctoral advisor.

She taught at College of William & Mary and Virginia Wesleyan College. In August 1997, Perreault joined University of Central Arkansas as an assistant professor of history. She later joined the faculty at Salisbury University where she served as a department chair and was promoted to professor of history and associate provost. She served as provost of the Buffalo State University.

In February 2019, Perreault joined Towson University as provost and executive vice president for academic and student affairs. In December 2022, Perreault was named as the interim president, succeeding Kim Schatzel. She assumed the role on February 1, 2023. She was succeeded by Mark R. Ginsberg on October 29, 2023.

=== Interesting facts ===
- Last meal wish on death row: Caviar & Potato Chips, Lobster Bisque, Strawberry Rhubarb pie
- She was a lead singer of a garage band

== Selected works ==
- Meyers, Debra; Perreault, Melanie, eds. (2006). Colonial Chesapeake: New Perspectives. Lexington Books. ISBN 978-0-7391-1092-8.
- Meyers, Debra; Perreault, Melanie, eds. (2014). Order and Civility in the Early Modern Chesapeake. Lexington Books. ISBN 978-0-7391-8975-7.
