= Mary Beaumont Welch =

American educator and suffragist

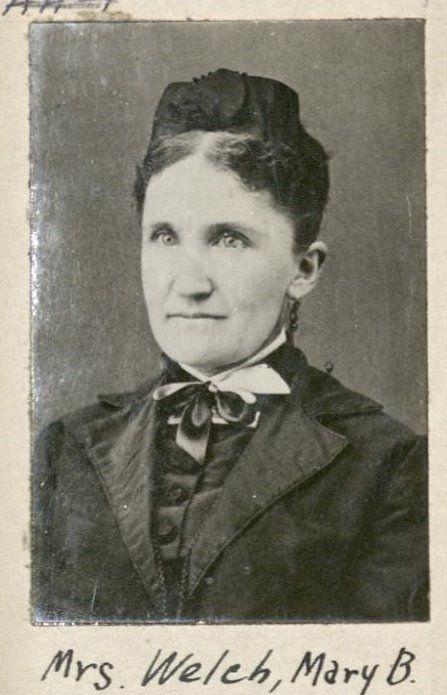
Mary B. Welch

Mary Beaumont Welch (July 3, 1841 – January 2, 1923) was an American educator and suffragist. Welch, who taught at what later became Iowa State University, developed the first home economics classes given for college credit. She also wrote the first book on the topic called Mrs. Welch's Cookbook, publishing in 1884.

== Biography ==
Welch was born in Lyons, New York, on July 3, 1841. Welch graduated from Elmira Seminary and worked as a teacher. Her first husband, George E. Dudley, whom she married in 1858, died in 1860. Welch married Adonijah Welch on February 3, 1868. She had two children with her first husband and two with Adonijah.

Welch created the Department of Domestic Economy at Iowa State and these classes were the first on the subject to award college credit. She was head of the department from 1875 to 1883. At Iowa State, she taught classes including botany, chemistry, geology, physics, and physiology.

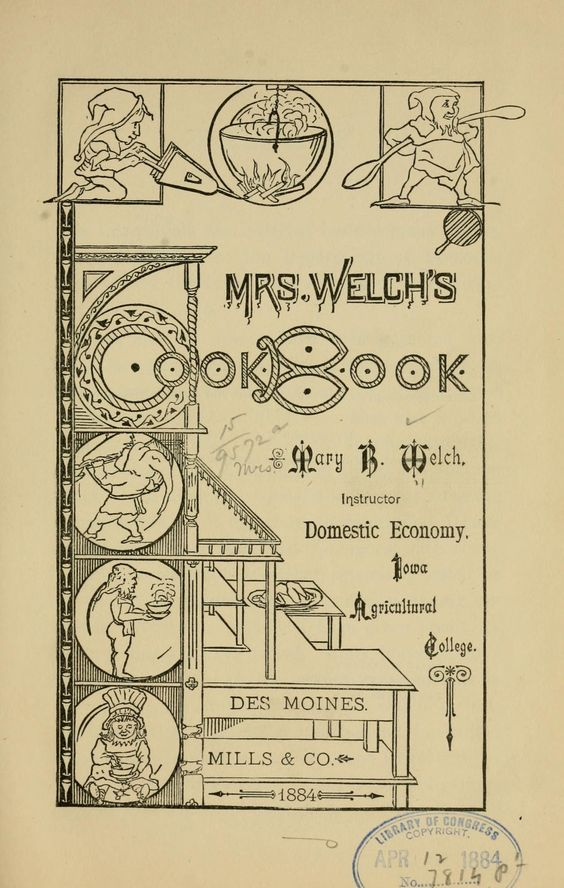
Mary B. Welch's Cookbook

Her original curriculum included tying the sciences to domestic economy. Her students only cooked on an oak stove as gas, electronic, and aluminum appliances were not yet available during that time. Students also learned the value of food, the chemistry composition, and action of baking powder. Welch published the first book on home economics in 1884, called Mrs. Welch's Cookbook. This cookbook was partly based on her time in New York City, New York and Kensington, England where she studied.

The Iowa Woman Suffrage Association (IWSA) elected Welch president in 1888.

In 1889, Adonijah died and the next year, Welch married Dwight Welch. At the end of December of 1923, Welch had a severe stroke and three days later on January 2, died in her home in Pasadena, California. Her ashes were returned to Ames and buried next to Adonijah in the college cemetery.

Welch was inducted into the Iowa Women's Hall of Fame in 1992.

== Legacy at Iowa State University ==
To honor all of Mary Beaumont Welch's contributions to the school and community, there are places surrounding campus that are named after her. There is a Welch Avenue located in Campustown and a Welch residence hall on campus. The domestic science building that was created during Welch's time is still standing today. Iowa State University now provides classes for undergraduate Family Consumer Science students such as Educational Principles for Family and Consumer Sciences, Foundations of Career and Technical Education in Family and Consumer Sciences, and Pre-Student Teaching Experience in FCS Education: Practicum in Diverse Settings.
