= Adonijah Welch =

American politician

Adonijah Strong Welch
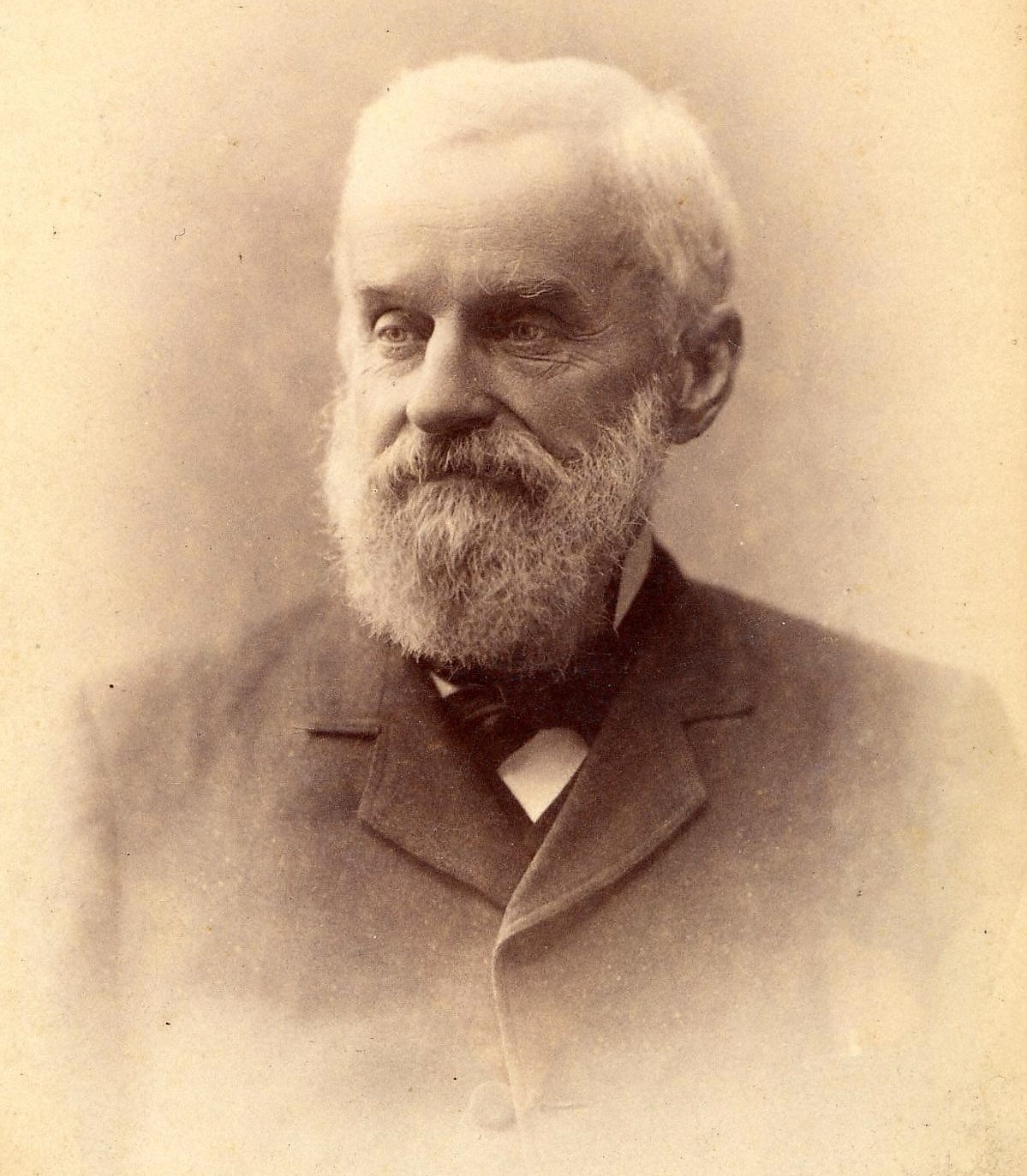

United States Senator from Florida
- In office June 17, 1868 – March 3, 1869
- Preceded by: Stephen Mallory
- Succeeded by: Abijah Gilbert

1st President of Iowa State Agricultural College
- In office 1869–1883
- Preceded by: office established
- Succeeded by: Seaman A. Knapp

1st Principal of the Michigan State Normal School
- In office 1851–1865
- Preceded by: office established
- Succeeded by: David Porter Mayhew

Personal details
- Born: April 12, 1821 East Hampton, Connecticut
- Died: March 14, 1889 (aged 67) Pasadena, California
- Party: Republican
- Spouse: Mary Beaumont Welch
- Education: University of Michigan Law School

Adonijah Strong Welch (April 12, 1821 – March 14, 1889) was a United States senator from Florida and the first president of Iowa State Agricultural College (now Iowa State University). Welch also served as Michigan State Normal School's first principal (now Eastern Michigan University).

== Early life ==
Born in East Hampton, Connecticut, Welch moved to Jonesville, Michigan, in 1839 and graduated from the University of Michigan in 1846. Welch was admitted to the bar in 1847 and became a high school principal in 1849. He spent about a year participating in the California Gold Rush of 1849.

== Career ==
Welch served as the first principal of Michigan State Normal School (now Eastern Michigan University) from 1851 to 1865. In 1859, he married Eunice P. Buckingham and they had three children.

In 1865, Welch moved to Pensacola, Florida, and eventually to Jacksonville, Florida, for unspecified health reasons. There, he established a lumber mill and engaged in orange growing. His wife, Eunice, died in 1867. In 1868, he married Mary Beaumont Dudley, with whom he had two more children.

As part of the post-Civil War Reconstruction, Florida was readmitted to the United States in 1868. Welch was elected by the legislature to the U.S. Senate as a Republican. He served in the Senate for less than nine months but declined renomination.

Adonija Welch married Mary Beaumont Welch on February 3, 1868.

Instead, he chose to accept an appointment as the first president of Iowa State Agricultural College. He served as college president from 1869 to 1883 before resigning. Welch felt that Iowa State was a progressive institution and was proud that it allowed women to attend classes.

From 1885 until his death, Welch served as a psychology professor at Iowa State. In 1889, he died at his summer home in Pasadena, California. Adonijah Welch is interred at Iowa State College Cemetery in Ames, Iowa.

== Welch Hall ==
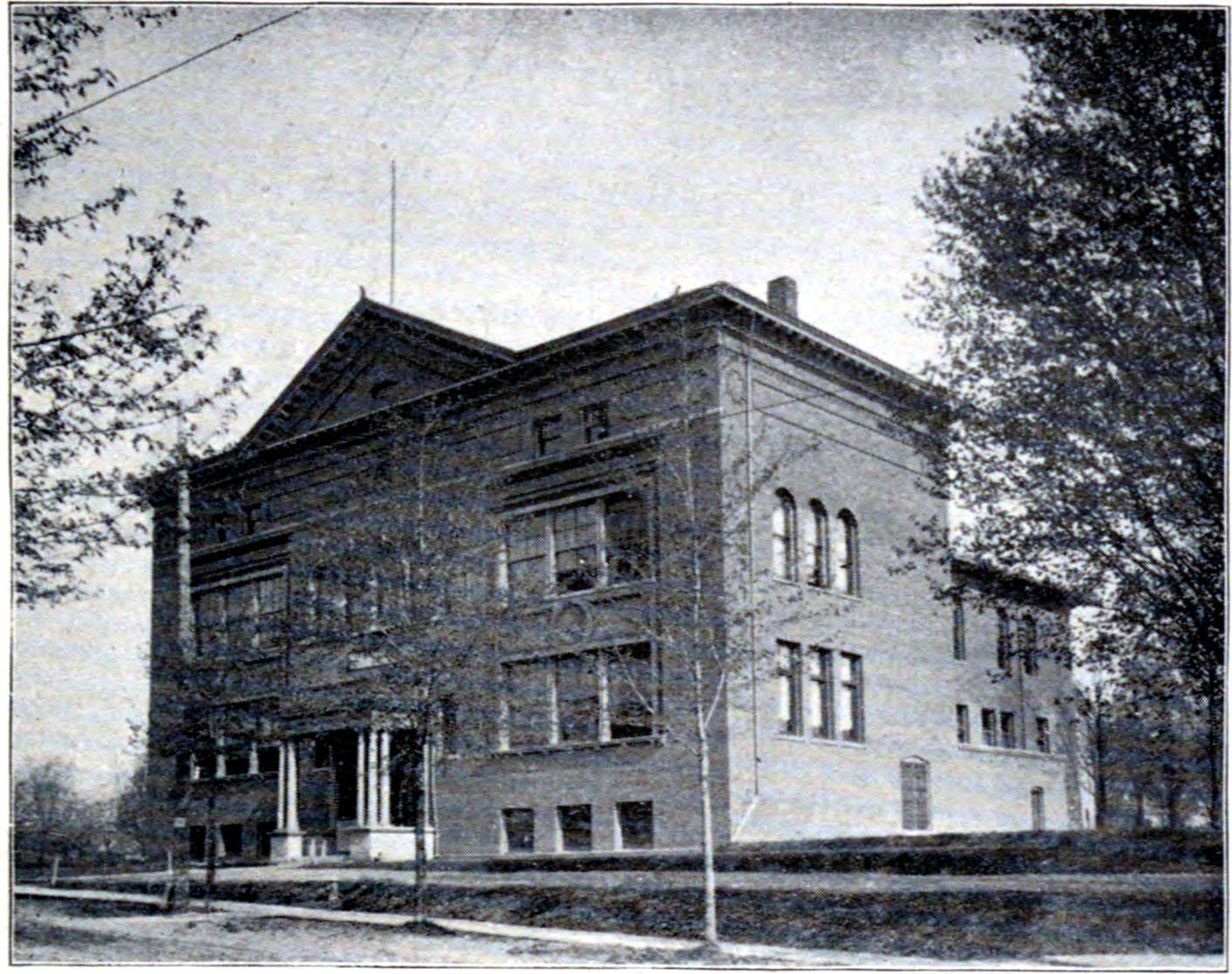
Welch Hall, an Eastern Michigan University Historic District contributing property

Welch Hall, named after him, was constructed in 1895 at Michigan State Normal School (now Eastern Michigan University). Welch Hall is the second-oldest building on the EMU campus. The building is designed in the Georgian Revival style.

The building's original name was the "Training School"; it served as the Teacher Training School from 1896 to the 1960s. During the building's lifetime, Welch has served as classroom space and various department offices. Due to poor maintenance, the building was closed during the 1980s and almost demolished. In 1984, Welch Hall was added to the National Register of Historic Places. Today, Welch Hall has been restored. It houses EMU's executive offices, which include the Office of the President.

== See also ==
- List of United States senators from Florida
- Florida's congressional delegations
- Iowa State University notables

Academic offices
Preceded by Position established	President of Iowa State University (1869-1883)	Succeeded by Seaman A. Knapp
U.S. Senate
Preceded by vacant	U.S. senator (Class 1) from Florida; 1868–1869; Served alongside: Thomas W. Osborn	Succeeded by Abijah Gilbert
