= Robert Caret =

American academic (born 1947)

Robert Laurent Caret
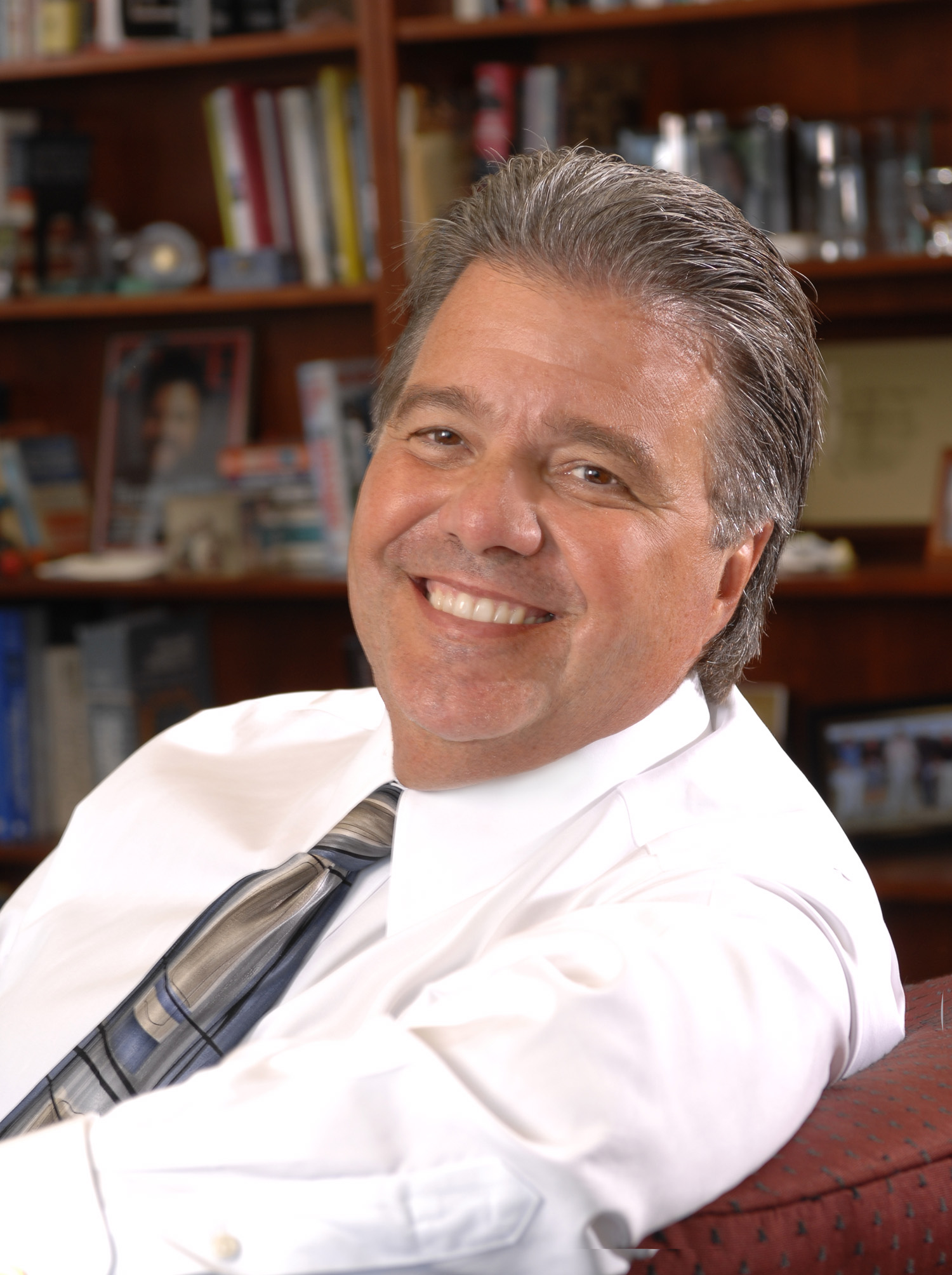
- Caret in 2007

4th Chancellor of the University System of Maryland
- In office July 1, 2015 – January 6, 2020
- Preceded by: William Kirwan
- Succeeded by: Jay A. Perman

26th President of the University of Massachusetts System
- In office November 1, 2011 – June 30, 2015
- Preceded by: Jack M. Wilson
- Succeeded by: Marty Meehan

12th President of Towson University
- In office July 1, 2003 – April 19, 2011
- Preceded by: Dan L. Jones
- Succeeded by: Maravene Loeschke

23rd President of San José State University
- In office 1995–2003
- Preceded by: J. Handel Evans
- Succeeded by: Joseph N. Crowley

Personal details
- Born: October 7, 1947 (age 78) Biddeford, Maine, U.S.
- Children: 4
- Education: Suffolk University (B.S.); University of New Hampshire (Ph.D.)

Robert Laurent Caret (born October 7, 1947) is an American academic and university administrator. He is the former chancellor of the University System of Maryland and former president of San José State University, Towson University and the University of Massachusetts System.

== Education ==
Born in Biddeford, Maine to a restaurant owner, Caret was the first in his family to attend college. Caret received his Ph.D. in organic chemistry from the University of New Hampshire in 1974 and his bachelor's degree in chemistry and mathematics from Suffolk University in 1969. His honorary degrees include a Doctor of Humane Letters from Saint Joseph's College of Maine and Westfield State University (2012) San Jose University (2004) and National Hispanic University (1997) and a Doctor of Science degree from Suffolk University (1996).

== Career ==
=== San José State University ===
Caret became president of San José State University in February 1995. In 1997 Caret and former San José Mayor Susan Hammer discussed the idea of creating a joint library to benefit the city of San Jose and San Jose State University. The resulting Dr. Martin Luther King, Jr. Library opened in August 2003 and became the first joint university and city library in the United States. Additionally the library is the largest west of the Mississippi, with 8 stories plus a mezzanine and serves over 1 million people every year. On May 5, 2003 San Jose State's board of regents voted to name the plaza in front of the library the Robert L. Caret Plaza.

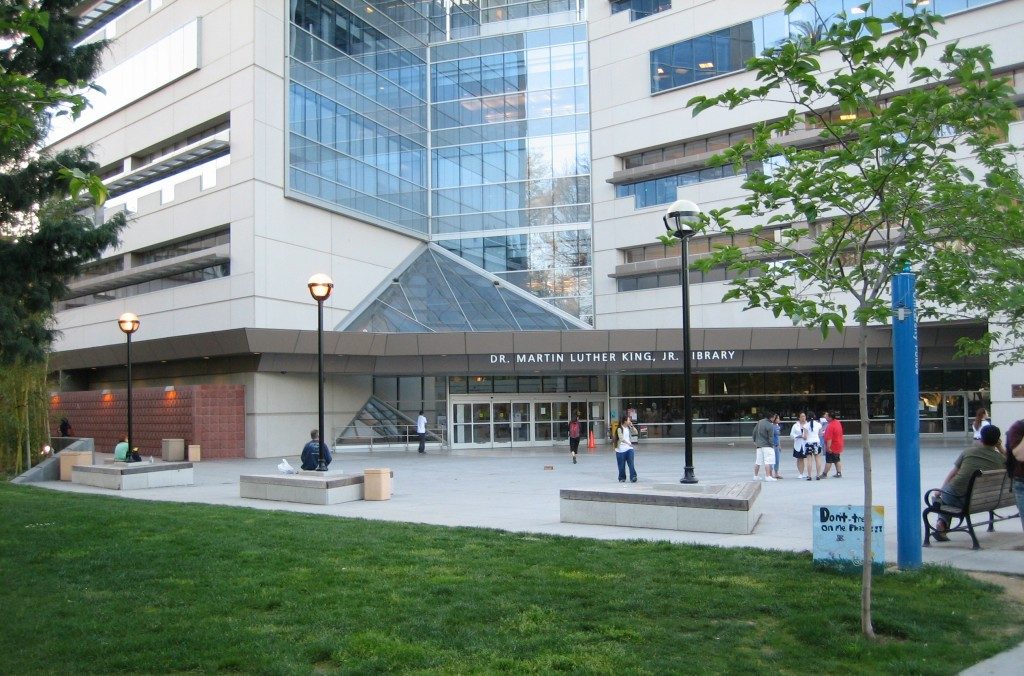
The Robert L. Caret Plaza outside of the Dr. Martin King Jr. Library at San José State University

=== Towson University ===
From 2003 to 2011, Caret was president of Towson University where he had previously served as a faculty member, dean, executive vice president and provost during his 29-year tenure. As president of Towson University, he created partnerships with regional business, non-profit and civic organizations; raised student graduation rates; and undertook a capital fundraising and building campaign to support campus infrastructure improvements. He oversaw an increase in the university's online courses and expanded the availability of TU courses at regional higher education centers. He was instrumental in establishing Towson University in Northeastern Maryland, which offers transfer students the flexibility to pursue a four-year degree after completing an associate degree at a community college. During more than 25 years collectively at Towson University, Caret served as a faculty member, dean, executive vice president and provost.

=== University of Massachusetts System ===
From Towson University, he moved to the University of Massachusetts System, where he served as president of UMass and its five campuses. Throughout his UMass tenure, he has emphasized efficiency, cost-saving initiatives, and productive working relationships with Massachusetts government and business leaders. His successful pursuit of a 50-50 funding formula for UMass resulted in the state and students contributing equally to the university's general education program and a 22 percent increase in the base budget for two years. He also secured additional state funding, allowing UMass to freeze tuition and mandatory fees for in-state undergraduate students for two consecutive years.

=== University System of Maryland ===
On December 17, 2014, it was announced that Caret would be the next chancellor of the University System of Maryland, replacing William English Kirwan who announced in May 2014 that he would retire upon the appointment and start date of his successor.

He was inaugurated as the system's fourth chancellor on November 19, 2015. As USM chancellor, Caret continued to focus on areas that have earned him national respect for his success in such areas helping to ensure college affordability, academic excellence, and the efficient use of resources. In addition, he is credited with emphasizing university partnerships to enhance students' experiences and to impact regional progress in economic and workforce development.

Early in his tenure, he led a four-day "Statewide Listening Tour" throughout all regions of Maryland to meet with leaders in business, economic development, and community engagement. The 900-mile bus tour provided the basis for policy initiatives that have helped the university system work with political leaders and engaged citizens to help advance the state.

Caret told regents he would not seek a renewal of his contract and that he would step down in the summer of 2020. Once his successor was named, Caret offered to step down earlier and was succeeded by Jay Perman on Jan. 6, 2020. Officials said he would go on sabbatical and return to the Towson faculty following the sabbatical. He instead joined the Florida executive recruitment firm Greenwood/Asher & Associates, where he is vice president of executive search. Greenwood/Asher is the same firm that assisted UMass in recruiting to fill its presidential vacancy in 2010.

== Awards and recognition ==
Caret serves and has served on a number of national boards, including the Association of Public and Land-Grant Universities (Chair 2017-2018); the Southern Regional Higher Education Board; the National Association of System Heads (Chair 2017-2018); the Business-Higher Education Forum Board; the Association of Governing Boards of Universities and Colleges President's Council; the American Association of State Colleges and Universities (2004-2008); and the American Council on Education (2005-2008) His service on boards in the state of Maryland includes the Baltimore Council on Foreign Affairs, Greater Baltimore Committee, Economic Alliance of Greater Baltimore, University of Maryland Medical System, Institute of Human Virology, College Savings Plans of Maryland, World Trade Center Institute, Maryland Council on Economic Education, BioHealth Innovation, Inc., and the Maryland Economic Development Corporation. Additionally, he serves on The Center Club Strategic Planning Advisory Committee.

During his years in Massachusetts, he served on the Massachusetts Economic Development Planning Council, the Massachusetts Life Sciences Center Board, the Massachusetts Clean Energy Center Board, the Massachusetts Green High Performance Computing Center Board, the Massachusetts Technology Collaborative Board, the Edward M. Kennedy Institute for the United States Senate Board, the New England Council Board, the Greater Boston Chamber of Commerce Board, and as a member of the Massachusetts Business Roundtable.

Caret has made numerous presentations and published professionally in the fields of chemistry, chemical education and higher education. He has authored chapters in two monographs on the mission and role of institutions, and has co-authored and published several textbooks in the fields of organic chemistry and allied health chemistry.

His awards and recognitions include: The Daily Record Icon Honors Award (2017); The Daily Record Influential Marylander Award (2016); Towson University's Hillel Gesher Award (2010); Baltimore County Chamber of Commerce Leadership Hall of Fame Award (2006); Maryland Chapter of the American Chemical Society George L. Braude Award (2005); Boston Business Journal Power 50 (multiple years); Silicon Valley's "100 Power Brokers, San Jose Magazine (2003); the Italian American Heritage Foundation Achievement Award (2001); Outstanding College President Award from the All-American Football Foundation (2001); Silicon Valley's Top 40 Most Powerful Individuals, San Jose Mercury News (2000); National Hispanic University, Tomas Rivera Leadership Award (1999); Silicon Valley Metropolitan Chamber of Commerce Excellence in Leadership Award (1999); Award of Excellence, Suffolk University General Alumni Association (1986); and the D.C. Institute of Chemists Teacher Award (1981). He is also listed in several editions of "Who's Who in America".
