= Maravene Loeschke =

American educator

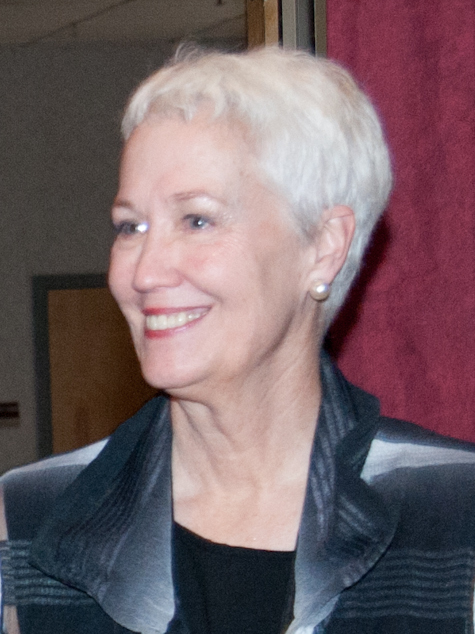
Loeschke in 2013

Maravene Sheppard Loeschke (January 28, 1947 – June 25, 2015) was an American academic administrator who served as president of Towson University from 2012 to her retirement in 2014. She had previously taught at Towson from 1970 to 2002 before leaving Maryland for Pennsylvania, to become the provost of Wilkes University, then the president of Mansfield University.

== Early life and education ==
Loeschke was born on January 28, 1947, in Baltimore to Joseph Sheppard and Aumelia Shriner. Her father worked for the Baltimore County transportation department. Her mother was born at what became Tides Inn in the Northern Neck of Virginia and worked as a secretary for Towson Elementary School. Maravene Sheppard graduated from Parkville High School in 1965 and attended Towson State College, where she studied English and theater under the direction of C. Richard Gillespie. Though she planned a move to New York to begin an acting career upon her graduation in 1969, Gillespie convinced her to join Towson's faculty instead. Loeschke earned a master's degree in education from Towson in 1972. She then obtained a Ph.D. from Union Institute and University.

== Career ==
Loeschke began teaching at Towson in 1970 and served as the theater arts department chair before being named the dean of the College of Fine Arts and Communication in 1997. She left Towson in 2002 for the position of provost at Wilkes University. After a four-year stint there, Loeschke completed a four-year term as president of Mansfield University, from 2006 to 2010. While at Mansfield, Loeschke began multiple programs that benefited commuter students, a majority of the student body. She returned to her alma mater in January 2012, succeeding Robert L. Caret as president. In 2013, Loeschke decided to end the baseball and men's soccer programs at Towson, causing Maryland Comptroller Peter Franchot to call for her to resign. With extra fundraising efforts, a fee increase, and a financial commitment from the state of Maryland, the baseball program was later restored. Loeschke was diagnosed with adrenal cancer in April 2014, and resigned the presidency in December of that year.

== Personal life ==
She was first married to Richard Loeschke, whom she later divorced. Loeschke then married C. Richard Gillespie in 1981, with whom she lived until her death in 2015 from adrenal cancer at Gilchrist Hospice Care. Towson held a memorial service honoring Loeschke on September 18, 2015.
