= Mark R. Ginsberg =

American psychologist and academic administrator

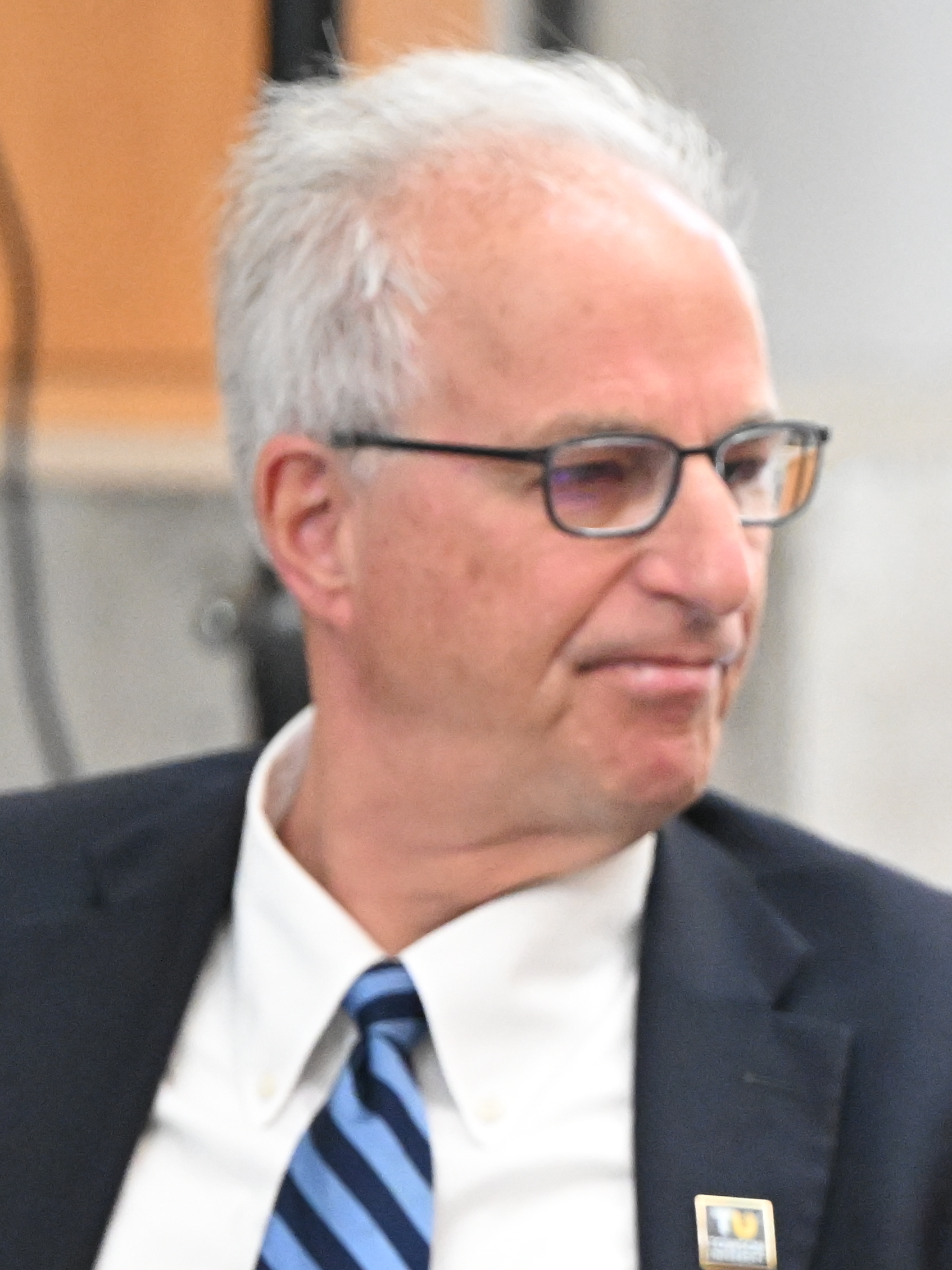
Ginsberg in 2025

Mark R. Ginsberg is an American psychologist and academic administrator who currently serves as the 15th president of Towson University. He served as provost and executive vice president of George Mason University from 2020 to 2023.

== Career ==
Ginsberg earned bachelor's degree from State University of New York at Cortland in 1975. He completed a master's degree (1978) and Ph.D. (1981) from Pennsylvania State University.

Ginsberg is a fellow of the American Psychological Association (APA) and the American Association for Marriage and Family Therapy.

In August 2023, the University System of Maryland Board of Regents voted to appoint Ginsberg president of Towson University. He began in the new role on Oct. 30, 2023. He said he planned to move into a university-owned apartment building and spend most of his time on campus.

Prior to his appointment at TU, he spent nearly 14 years at George Mason University, where he served as the dean of the College of Education and Human Development from 2010 to 2020 and the provost and executive vice president from 2020 to 2023.

As the chief academic officer at GMU, Ginsberg oversaw programming of the largest public research university in Virginia and one of the nation's 146 Carnegie R1 institutions, a classification awarded to universities with the highest levels of research activity.

Prior to joining Mason, Ginsberg was the executive director of the National Association for the Education of Young Children from 1999 to 2010. In addition, Ginsberg spent more than 20 years on the full-time and part-time faculty at The Johns Hopkins University in both the School of Medicine and the School of Education, including serving as the chair of the academic Department of Counseling and Human Services.

Other previous employment has included the position of executive director of the American Association for Marriage and Family Therapy (AAMFT) from 1986 to 1993; a senior member of the leadership of the American Psychological Association (APA) from 1981 to 1986; and a faculty member in the Department of Psychology at the University of Rochester.

Ginsberg has served as a volunteer leader with multiple non-profit organizations. Currently, he serves on the Board of Directors of the Greater Baltimore Committee, the leading economic and civic organization for the Baltimore region, and the CollegeBound Foundation. He is the immediate past-chair of the Board of Directors of Parents as Teachers (PAT), one of the most respected international organizations in education. PAT is an early childhood development program that provides research-based home visiting services supporting families to parent their children who are healthy, learning and ready for school. For more than a decade, he has served as a member of the international advisory board for the Early Years Organization of Northern Ireland.

Ginsberg is a past-chair of the Board of Directors of the American Association of Colleges for Teacher Education (AACTE) and had served as a member of the executive committee and Board of Directors of both the Association of Chief Academic Officers (ACAO), the national association of university provosts, and the Council of Academic Deans of Research Education Institutions (CADREI). He also has been a member of the Board of Directors of the Virginia Early Childhood Foundation (VECF).

In addition, he is a past-president of both the International Step by Step Association (ISSA), a nongovernmental organization of education and child/youth development focused NGOs in Europe and Central Asia, and the Society of Psychologists in Leadership (SPIL).

He also served on the Board of Directors of Hopecam, a national non-profit organization that supports children with cancer and their families; and was an appointed member of the Fairfax County (VA) Successful Children and Youth Policy Team.

Ginsberg has published widely in the areas of psychology, education, human development and human services. He has lectured and presented at over 200 conferences, seminars and other educational meetings and professional development events, both within the United States and internationally. In addition, he has received many professional honors and recognitions including the Distinguished Alumni Award from the Pennsylvania State University, Distinguished Leadership Award from the American Association for Marriage and Family Therapy, election to the Kappa Delta Pi national honor society and appointment to many boards and advisory committees in the fields of education and human services.

Ginsberg is married to University of Maryland professor emerita, Elaine A. Anderson.
