= William Shelton (university administrator) =

William Shelton is a university administrator, having served as President of Eastern Michigan University for 11 years and interim Chancellor at East Carolina University. Born in Tennessee and earned a bachelor's and master's degrees in history from the University of Memphis. He was conferred a doctorate degree in higher education administration from the University of Mississippi. He has been a sportscaster, and on the NCAA Presidents Commission, and chaired the NCAA Committee on Sportsmanship and Ethical Conduct in Intercollegiate Athletics. In 1995 he was the president of the Mid-American Conference. Before coming to ECU in 2000, he was the president of Eastern Michigan University for 11 years.
