= Samuel A. Kirkpatrick =

President of Eastern Michigan University, 2001–2004

Samuel A. Kirkpatrick was president of the University of Texas at San Antonio (UTSA) and Eastern Michigan University (EMU).

== Early life ==
Kirkpatrick earned a bachelor's degree in education from Shippensburg University and a masters and Ph.D. in political science from Pennsylvania State University. From 1970 until 1990, Kirkpatrick was a faculty member at various universities, eventually serving as head of the Political Science Department at Texas A&M University, and then Dean of the College of Liberal Arts and Sciences at Arizona State University.

== President of the University of Texas at San Antonio ==
Kirkpatrick served as the fourth president of UTSA, from 1990 through 1999. Under his leadership, UTSA underwent a major expansion in enrollment, faculty, building projects, and degree programs.

== President of Eastern Michigan University ==
In 2001, Kirkpatrick was hired as the president of Eastern Michigan University. He immediately pushed for the construction of a new president's house, arguing that a larger space was needed to host fundraisers and other official events. Kirkpatrick resigned from EMU in 2004, under pressure after a state investigation into the $6 million construction cost of University House, the new residence he had sought.
