= Fender (surname) =

Fender is a surname. Notable people with the surname include:

- Andrew Fender, British local politician
- Brian Fender, British academic administrator
- Chuck Fender (born 1972), American music artist
- Edward Fender (1942–2021), Polish luger
- Freddy Fender (1937–2006), Mexican-American musician
- Harry Fender (1896–1995), American entertainer and police detective
- Janet S. Fender, American physicist
- Leo Fender (1909–1991), American guitar maker, founder of the eponymous company
- Norman Fender (1910-1983), Welsh dual-code rugby international player
- Percy Fender (1892–1985), English cricketer
- Sam Fender (born 1994), English musician

== See also ==
- Bender (surname)
- Fender (disambiguation)
- Fenter
