= Fender =

Fender may refer to:

== Transport ==
- Fender (boating), a bumper used to keep boats from banging into docks or each other
- Fender (vehicle) or wing, a part of a motor vehicle that frames a wheel well
- Fender, a "cowcatcher" on a tram
- Fender, part of a Western saddle

== Other uses ==
- Fender (company), a U.S. manufacturer of stringed musical instruments and amplifiers
  - List of products manufactured by Fender Musical Instruments Corporation
- Fender (surname)
- Fender, Arkansas, a community in the United States
- Fender Pinwheeler, a fictional character in the 2005 film Robots
- The Fenders, a Brazilian rock band
- Fireplace fender, a fireplace accessory

== See also ==
- The Fender IV, a U.S. garage rock band
- Fend (disambiguation)
