= Double fender =

A double fender is a fender on the back wheel of motorcycles and mopeds which comprise a small fender, and a long fender in order to keep mud from going into the carburetor and on the motor. It covers the rear wheel's top and front. A double fender in fact keeps these areas dry during rain. The small fender directed to the front of the rear wheel is wider to prevent water spray from angling past the wheel. It acts more like a guard for rain rather than the top fender which in fact acts as a mudguard.
