= Curb feeler =

Device on a motor vehicle

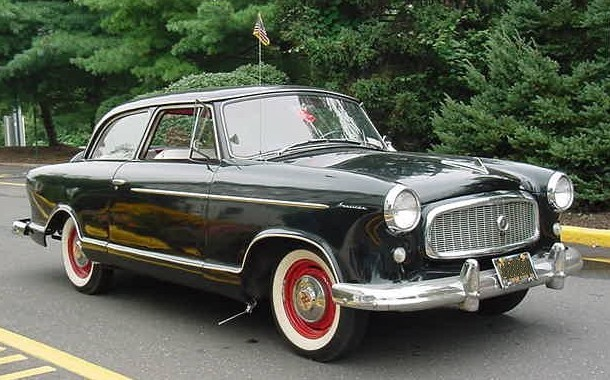
Curb feeler mounted behind the front wheel opening of a 1950s Rambler American

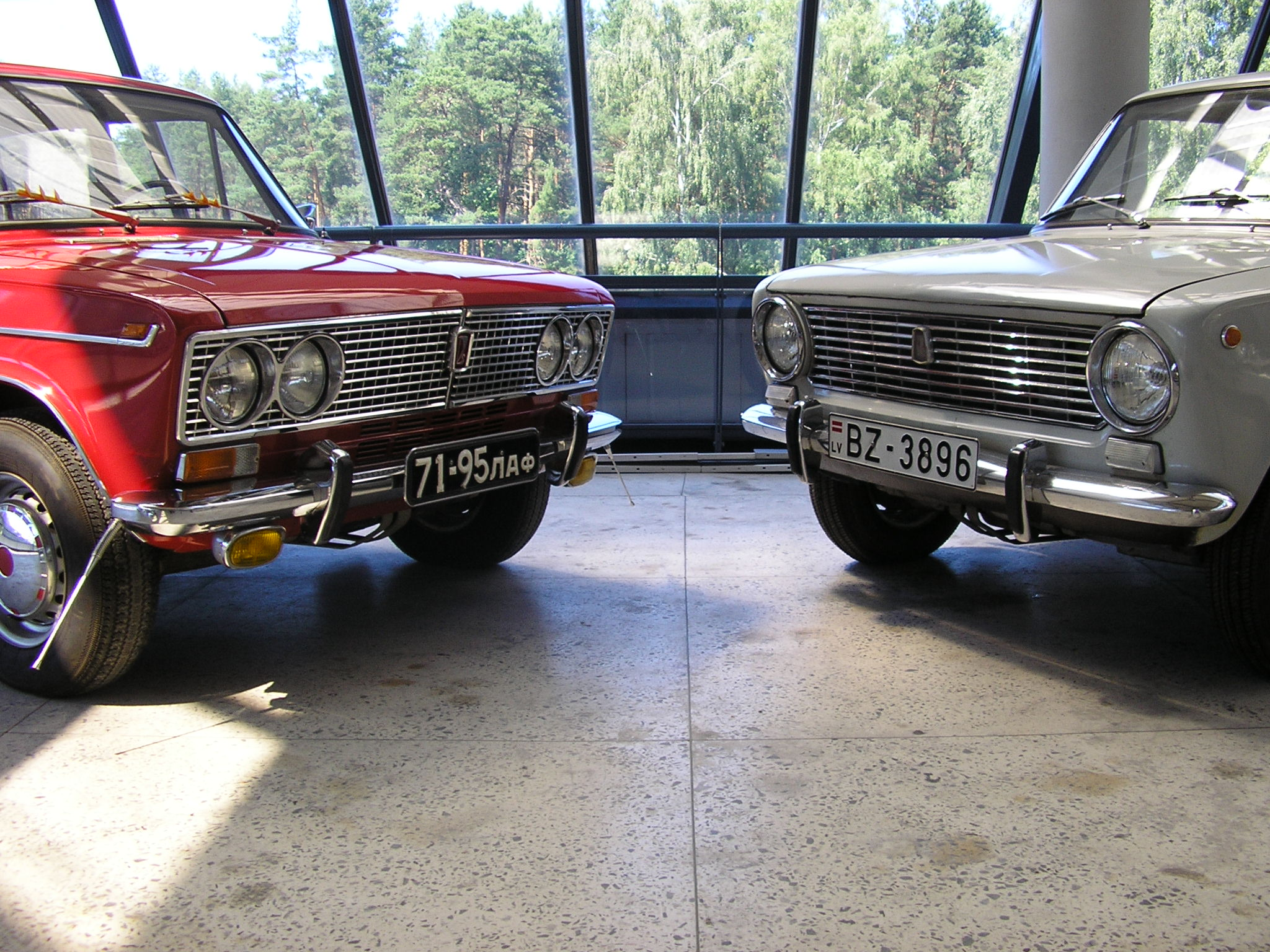
Curb feeler on a 1973 VAZ-2103 Ziguli (left) mounted in front of fender

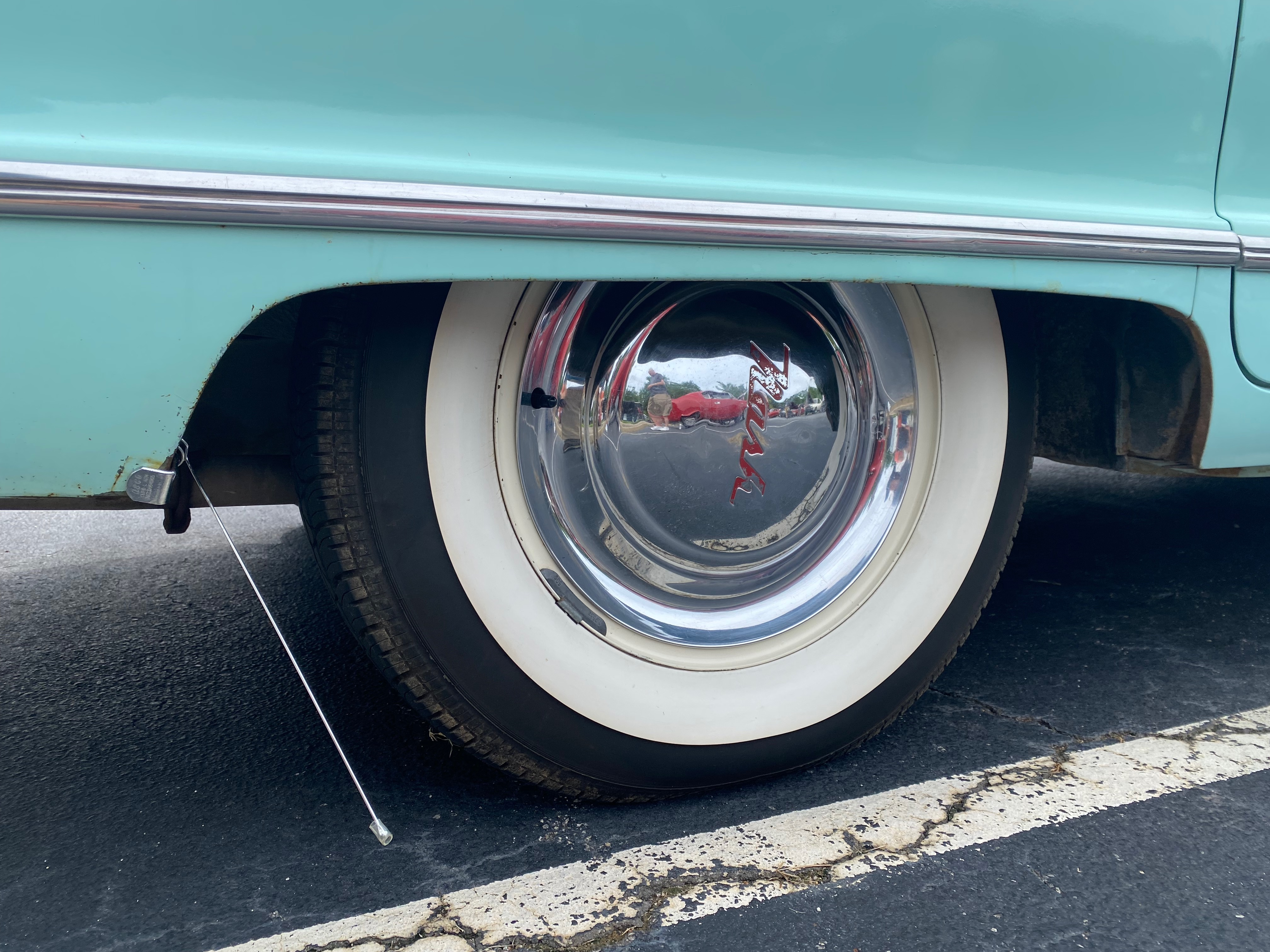
Curb feeler mounted behind rear wheel opening to help protect whitewall tire

Curb feelers or curb finders are automotive accessories designed to alert drivers when their vehicle is a safe distance from a curb while parking. Functioning much like a cat's whiskers, these devices consist of flexible metal springs or wires mounted low on the vehicle's body, close to the wheels.

When a vehicle approaches a curb, the protruding feelers scrape against the concrete before the body or wheels can make contact. This physical contact generates an audible scraping sound inside the cabin, warning the driver to halt before damaging the road wheels, hubcaps, or tires. Because they are manufactured using high-flexibility steel or alloy, they can withstand repetitive bending without breaking.

== Classic cars and hot rods ==
While standard on many mid-century vehicles, curb feelers are primarily found on hot rods and classic or antique cars to capture a 1950s aesthetic. They are especially useful for vehicles equipped with whitewall tires, which are easily permanently marred or stained by concrete abrasion.

Depending on the driver's needs, the configuration varies, but curb feelers are most commonly installed on the passenger side because that side typically faces the curb during parallel parking. They are usually placed just ahead of the front wheels, though some drivers choose to install them at the rear fender or near all four corners. Units feature either a single-wire or dual-wire/spring design to maximize the tactile detection area.

=== United States patents ===
During the peak of their popularity in the mid-20th century, inventors continually sought to refine the curb feeler's durability and signaling mechanisms. The following United States patents illustrate this evolution:

- Curb signal switch, number US2487922A, patented on 15 November 1947, by Alois C. Dechant and Frank C. Jachetta.

A device that will indicate to the driver of an automobile when the right side of the automobile has approached a curb or other side obstruction. Neither the device nor the automobile will be damaged by contact with curbs and other obstructions, such as persons standing close to the side of the vehicle.

- Curb proximity signaling device, number: US2592742A, patented on 15 April 1952, by Archie B. Rose.

This design aimed to solve the issue of traditional rigid feelers breaking or snapping when hit from unusual angles. Rose's invention introduced an assembly engineered to withstand massive deformations and structural strain from any direction. Once the distorting force (the curb) was removed, the mechanical spring system automatically snapped back to its original, functional shape. It achieved this multidirectional durability using a simplified design that was inexpensive to mass-manufacture.

- Curb feeler, number: US2902671A, patented on 1 September 1959, by Pitt Olas.

This design eliminates the harsh, annoying metal-on-concrete scraping sound characteristic of curb finders. Instead of relying on acoustics, Olas' system integrated an electromechanical circuit. The tip of the feeler included a soft, non-marring, resilient knob. When the knob touched an object, it completed an electrical loop that triggered a warning light or chime inside the vehicle's cabin. This idea bridged the gap between mechanical vintage whiskers and modern electronic parking sensors.

== Recreational vehicles ==
Large recreational vehicles (RVs) sometimes have curb feelers made of thick rubber or prolonged metal rods. Because RVs feature significantly wider bodies and larger blind spots, these indicators help prevent drivers from gouging, scraping, or slicing expensive tire sidewalls against curbs and low-clearance obstacles.

== Buses ==
Transit buses may use curb feelers to help drivers achieve docking at passenger platforms. By helping the operator safely guide the vehicle as close to the curb as possible without scraping or damaging the tires. The devices may also reduce the gap distance, allowing passengers to step on and off the bus more safely and easily.

== Mining and industrial equipment ==
The mechanical curb feeler concept has also been adapted for industrial safety. The United States Mine Safety and Health Administration (MSHA) highlights an analogous workaround for large continuous mining machinery to prevent injuries in tight underground spaces. Operators can construct a "pinch-point feeler" using a 4-to-5-foot (120 to 150 cm) section of heavy-duty conveyor belt (4 to 6 inches [10 to 15 cm] wide) and secure angle-iron brackets for mounting. When fixed to the corners of heavy machinery, this flexible belt functions like a vehicle's curb feeler. If the machine sweeps too close to a worker or a rib wall, the stiff yet flexible rubber gives a physical warning nudge to personnel without causing injury or sustaining structural damage. Adding reflective paint converts this feeler into a visual warning asset.

== Electronic and optical sensors ==
As automotive technology progressed, mechanical wires largely gave way to proximity sensors. Modern electronic curb feelers use optical, ultrasound, or laser technology to detect obstructions without physical contact.

In automotive engineering frameworks, electronic systems deploy pairs of optical sensors at the vehicle's front bumper. For example, the electronic curb feeler, number: US5701122, patented on 23 December 1997, by Thomas Canedy, uses two pairs of optical sensor units to detect an object located near the front end of a vehicle during parking signals to an in-cabin display or an audio module providing the driver with the location of the object as well as the distance the object is from the front of the vehicle.

These non-contact tactile concepts have been widely adopted in mobile robotics. Moreover, automated systems and specialized crewless or autonomous ground vehicles have been developed for military operations. These may use advanced laser-assisted curb feeler arrays to navigate safely through rubble and tight urban terrain.

== See also ==
- Fender skirts
