= Whitewall tire =

Tire with white sidewall

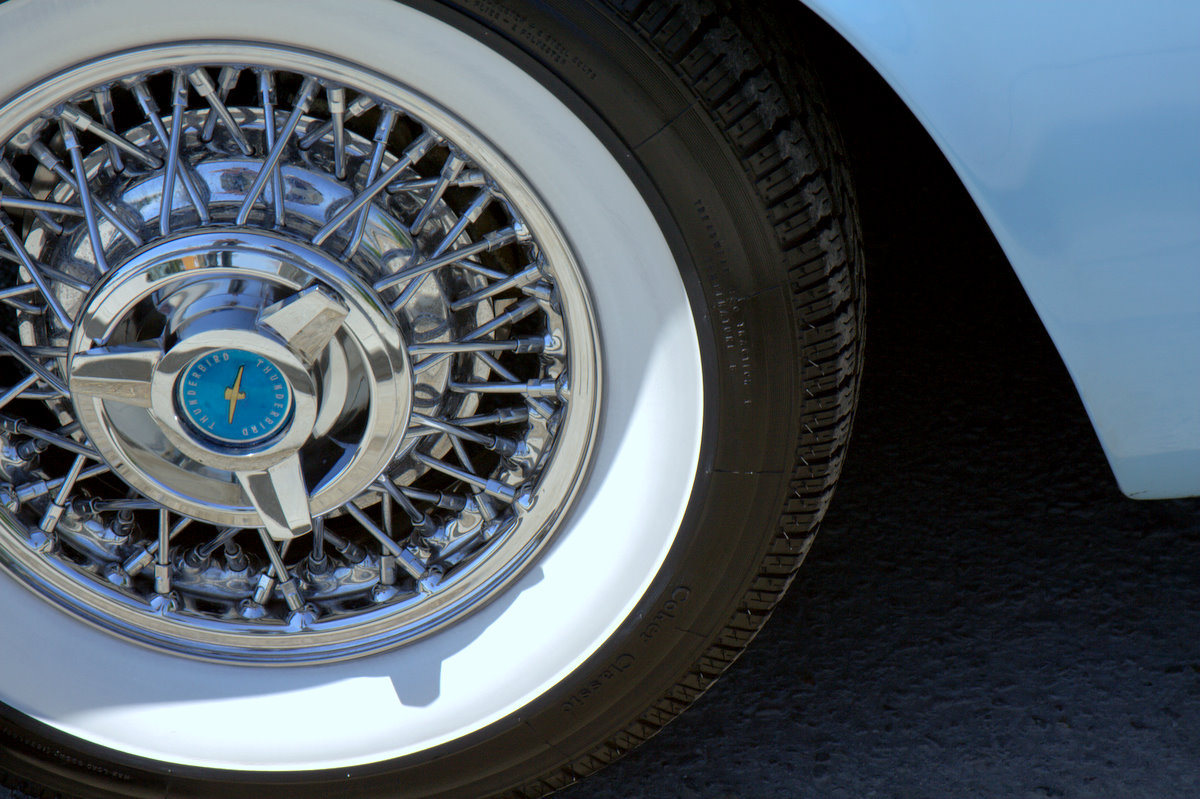
Coker Classic radial whitewall tires on a 1957 Ford Thunderbird

Whitewall tires or white-sidewall (WSW) tires are tires having a stripe or entire sidewall of white rubber. These tires were most commonly used from the early 1900s to around the mid-1980s.

== Background ==
The use of whitewall rubber for tire has been traced to a small tire company in Chicago called Vogue Tyre and Rubber Co that made them for their horse and chauffeur drawn carriages in 1914.

Early automobile tires were made of pure natural rubber with various chemicals mixed into the tread compounds to make them wear better. The best of these was zinc oxide, a pure white substance that increased traction and also made the entire tire white. However, the white rubber did not offer sufficient endurance, so carbon black was added to the rubber to greatly increase tread life. Later, entirely black tires became available, the still extant white sidewalls being covered with a somewhat thin, black colored layer of rubber. Should a black sidewall tire have been severely scuffed against a curb, the underlying white rubber would be revealed; it is in a similar manner that raised white letter (RWL) tires are made.

== Overview ==
The status of whitewall tires versus blackwall tires was originally the reverse of what it later became, with fully black tires requiring a greater amount of carbon black and less effort to maintain a clean appearance these were considered the premium tire; since the black tires first became available they were commonly fitted to many luxury cars through the 1930s. During the late-1920s, gleaming whitewalls contrasted against darker surroundings were considered a stylish, but high-maintenance, feature. The popularity of whitewalls as an option increased during the 1930s. On 6 April 1934, Ford introduced whitewall tires as an $11.25 (equivalent to $271 in 2025) option on all its new cars. But automobile designs incorporating streamlining directed visual interest away from tire walls.

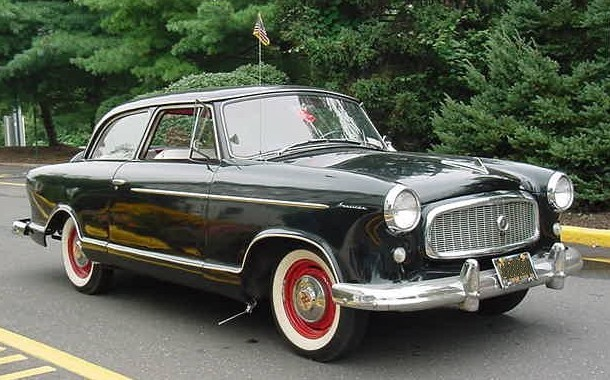
1950s Rambler American with vintage aftermarket "curb feeler"

The availability of whitewall tires was limited in the US during the supply shortages of raw materials during World War II and the Korean War.

Wide whitewall tires reached their height in popularity by the early-1950s. The 1957 production version of the Cadillac Eldorado Brougham was fitted with whitewalls that were reduced to a 1" wide stripe floating on the tire sidewall with a black area between this stripe and the wheel rim. The whitewall stripe width began to diminish as an attempt to reduce the perceived height of the wheel/tire. During the decade, increasingly lower vehicle heights were in vogue. During the 1950s, fender skirts also covered up white wall tires.

Wide whitewalls generally fell out of favor in the US by the 1962 model year. They continued as an option on the Lincoln Continental for some time thereafter but most common were narrower 3/4–1-inch (1.9–2.5 cm) stripe whitewalls. During the mid-1960s variations on the striped whitewall began to appear; a red/white stripe combination was offered on Thunderbirds and other high-end Fords, and triple white stripe variations were offered on Cadillacs, Lincolns, and Imperials. Whitewall tires were a popular option on new cars during the 1950s and 1960s, as well as in the replacement market. In some cases, having whitewall tires were a "must have" to get the right look on a car; and for those who could not afford the real deal, add-ons could be installed over the rim of the wheel that could leak if the pressure was too high.

New tires were wrapped in paper for shipping, to keep the white stripe clean, and for preventing the black of other tires from rubbing on the whitewall side. Maintaining a clean sidewall was an issue. Some motorists added aftermarket "curb feelers" that were attached at the bottom of the wheel opening lip to help reduce scraping the whitewall tire against curbs.

By 1968, wide whitewall tires were no longer available on the Chevrolet Corvette; replaced by F70x15 bias-ply nylon cord tires with thin stripes, either a narrow white or narrow red stripe.

The single-sided whitewall remained a desirable option through the 1970s, becoming a hallmark of "traditional luxury". Radial tires made by Vogue Tyre featured a narrow whitewall with a thin gold stripe line toward the edge of the tire. They were most often fitted to luxury cars.

== Modern ==
In the 1970s, when black wall tires became popular, brands also started switching to manufacturing radial models. This construction and the durable tread compound mix of black models enabled their better performance, handling, and service life. Full-fledged wide whitewalls have made a return in modified car culture. The resurgence of traditional hot rods, customs, retro, lowriders and resto-cal cars have also contributed to the resurgence in whitewall tires.

Although wide whitewalls are virtually nonexistent as a factory option on modern automobiles, they are still manufactured in original bias-ply or radial form by specialty outlets, such as Diamondback Classic tires, Coker Tire and Vogue Tyre. Longstone also have a small range of white band tires from Michelin. The last car available in the United Kingdom with whitewall tires was the Kia Pride. Some companies manufacture wide whitewall inserts - the so-called "Portawall" inserts are usually sold through Volkswagen Beetle restoration companies. Another modern incarnation has been tire decals, which can be applied to a normal tire to give the whitewall look.

Modern trends toward more minimal styling, and large wheels favoring very low-profile tires leave little room for a whitewall. The Lincoln Town Car continued to be offered with a factory whitewall option—a narrow white stripe—until its discontinuation in 2010. It is not currently [when?] offered as a factory option by any car manufacturer, but it is possible to order whitewalls for motorcycles (for example, the 2014–present Indian Chief).

== Port-a-wall inserts ==
A port-a-wall, also written as portawall or port-o-wall, is a removable aftermarket insert used to give a standard blackwall tire the appearance of a whitewall tire. The insert is typically fitted between the tire bead and the wheel rim, leaving a visible white band on the outer sidewall.

Port-a-wall inserts have been used as an alternative to full whitewall tires, especially in classic car restoration, custom car culture, hot rods, lowriders, vintage Volkswagens and other vehicles where a period-style appearance is desired.

The inserts are generally made from flexible rubber or similar synthetic materials. They are usually installed during tire mounting and held in place by the pressure between the tire and the wheel rim. Products are commonly sold in sets of four for automotive use. Fitment depends on tire size, sidewall height, rim design and installation method.

Port-a-wall inserts are primarily decorative accessories and are not tires themselves. They do not replace the structural or performance function of a tire. Improper installation or use on unsuitable low-profile tires may result in poor fitment, movement, rubbing or premature wear.

Modern whitewall insert products continue to be offered by specialist suppliers for classic and custom vehicles. Brands associated with this market include Omega Portawalls and Lyon Whitewalls.

== Gallery ==
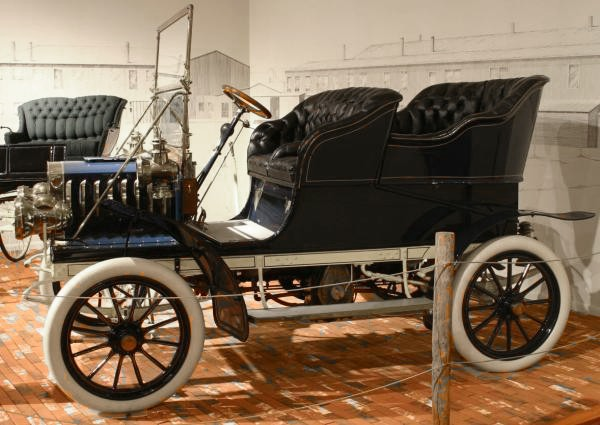
1904 Auburn with all white rubber tires

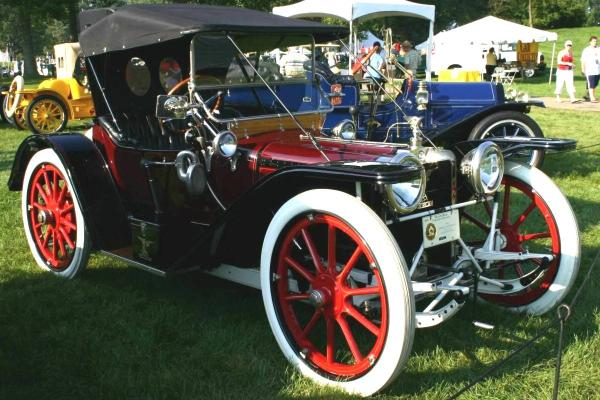
1913 American Underslung with all white tires

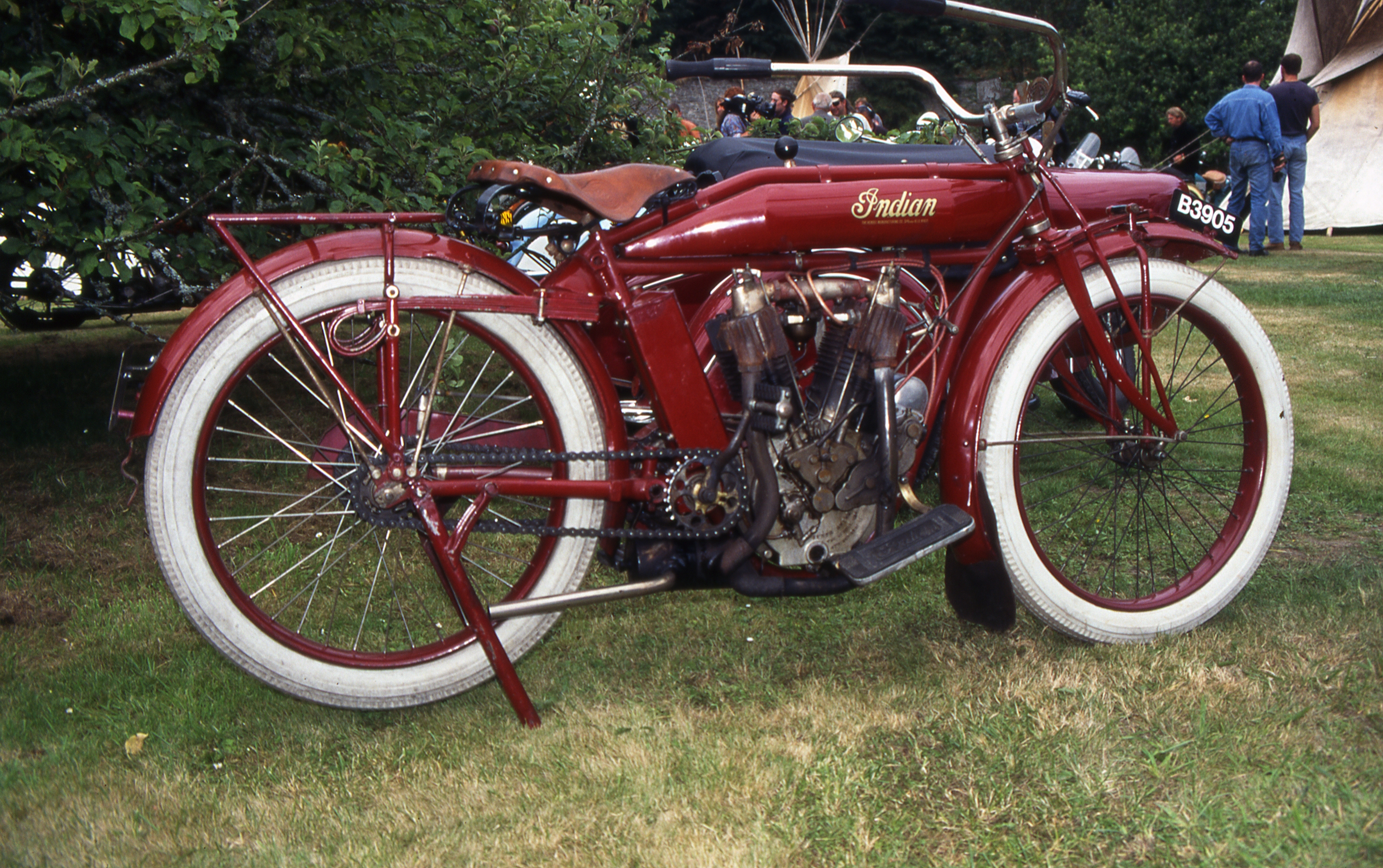
1913 Indian Big Twin with standard white rubber tires

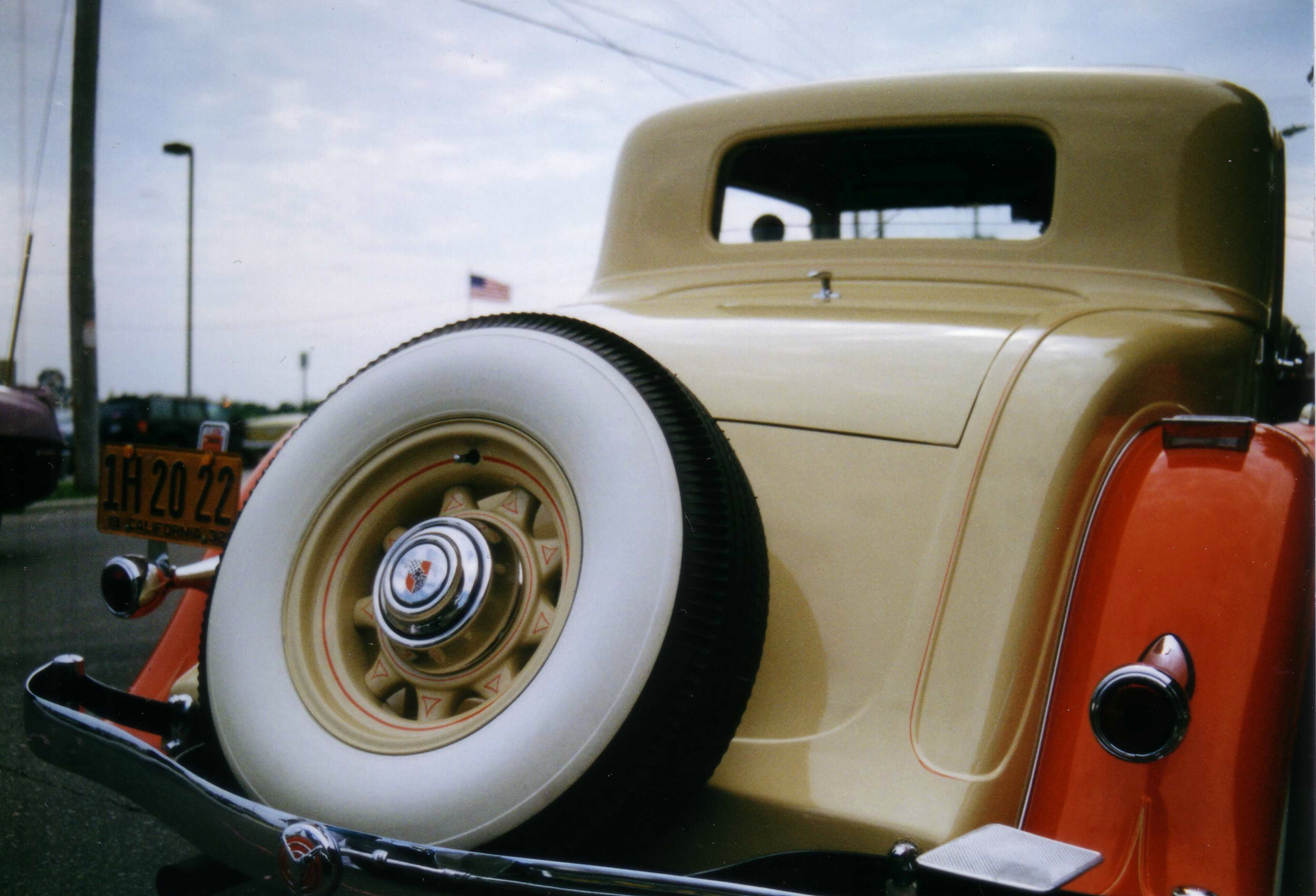
Firestone Deluxe Champion Whitewall sparetire (with thick white band) on a 1932 Nash Coupe

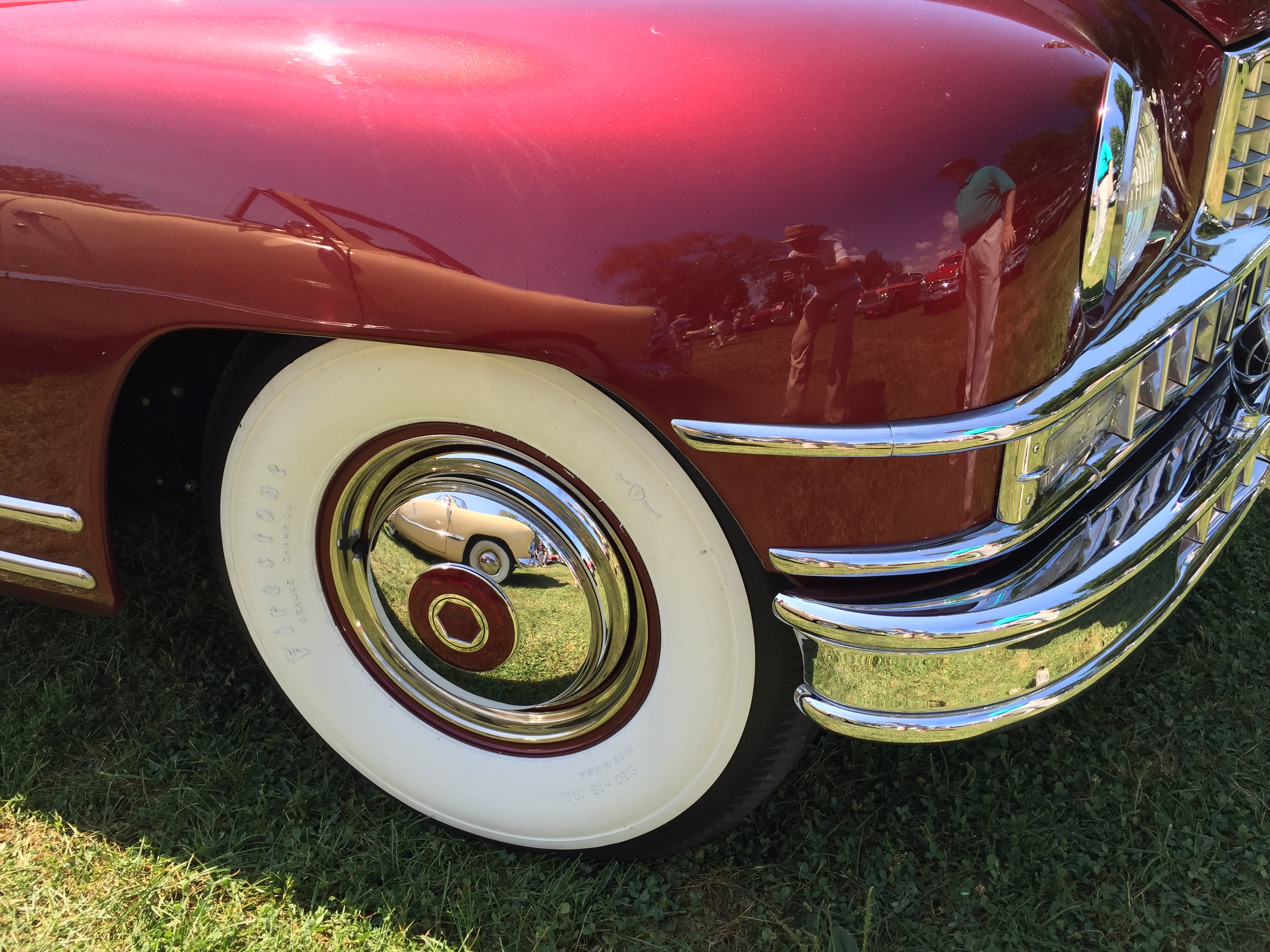
Wide whitewall tires were popular on premium automobiles

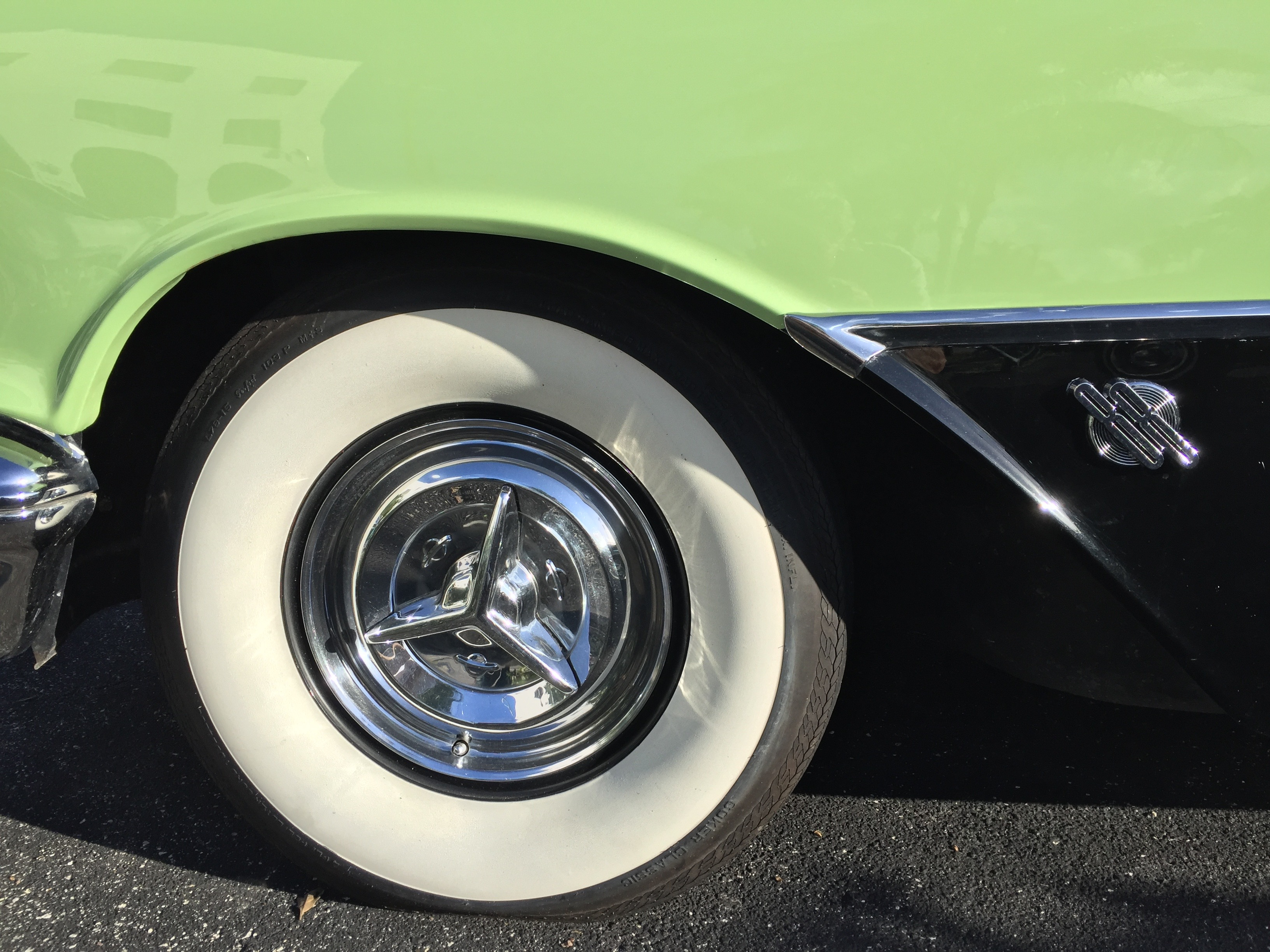
1956 Oldsmobile Super 88 with Coker Classic whitewall tires

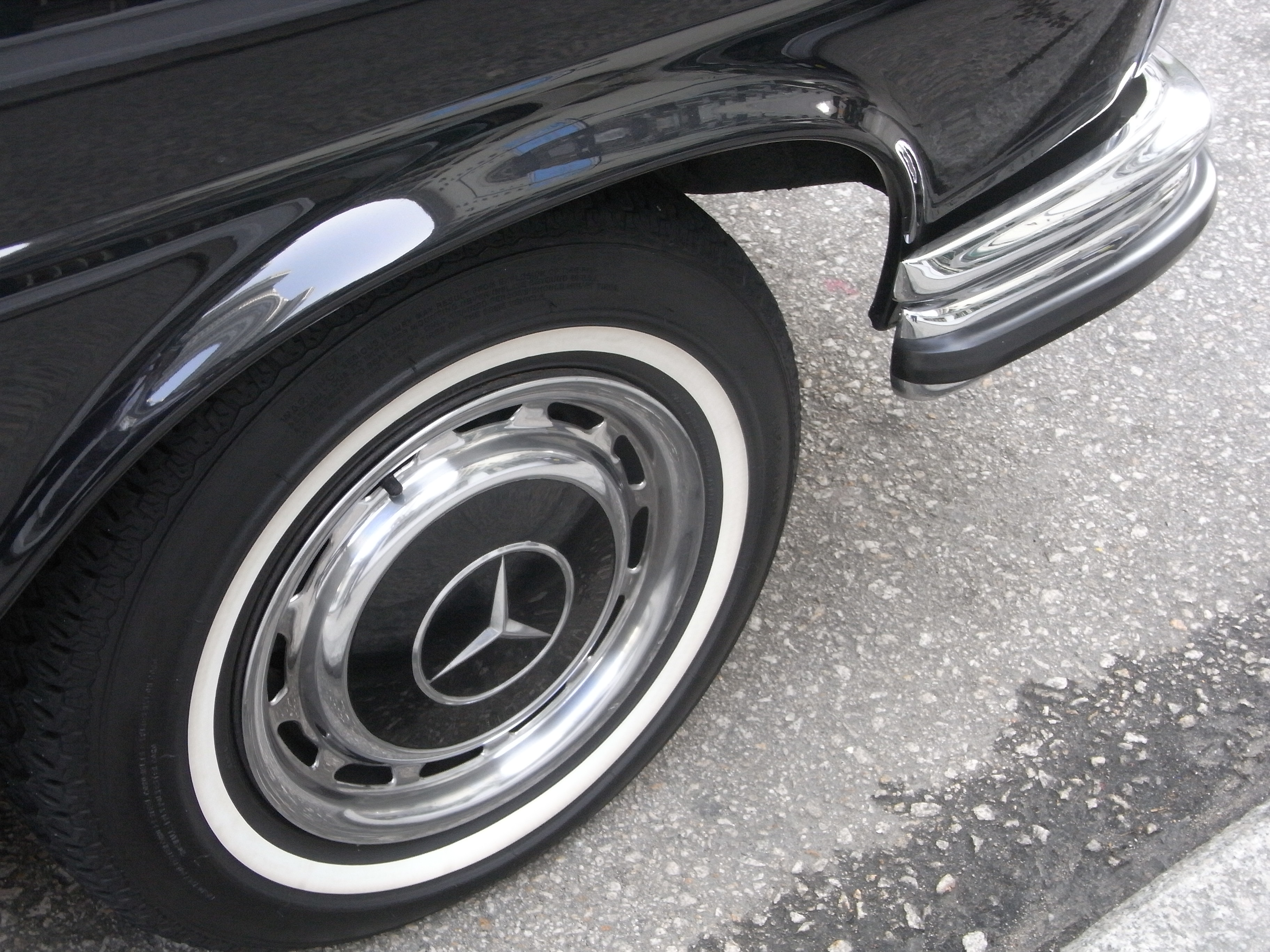
The white stripes on tires became narrower as the 1960s progressed

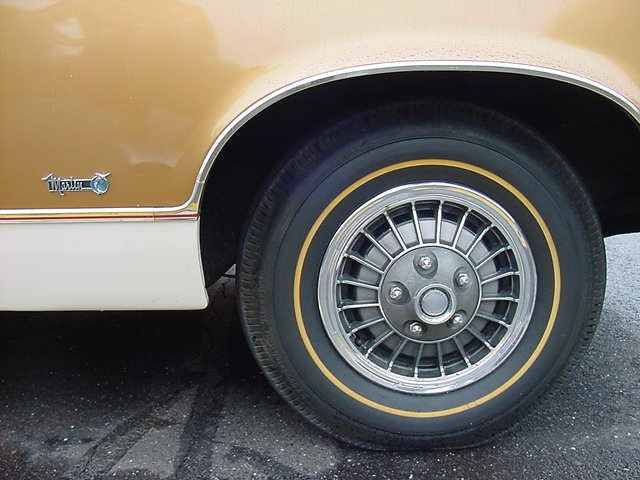
Narrow gold stripe performance tire from the 1960s

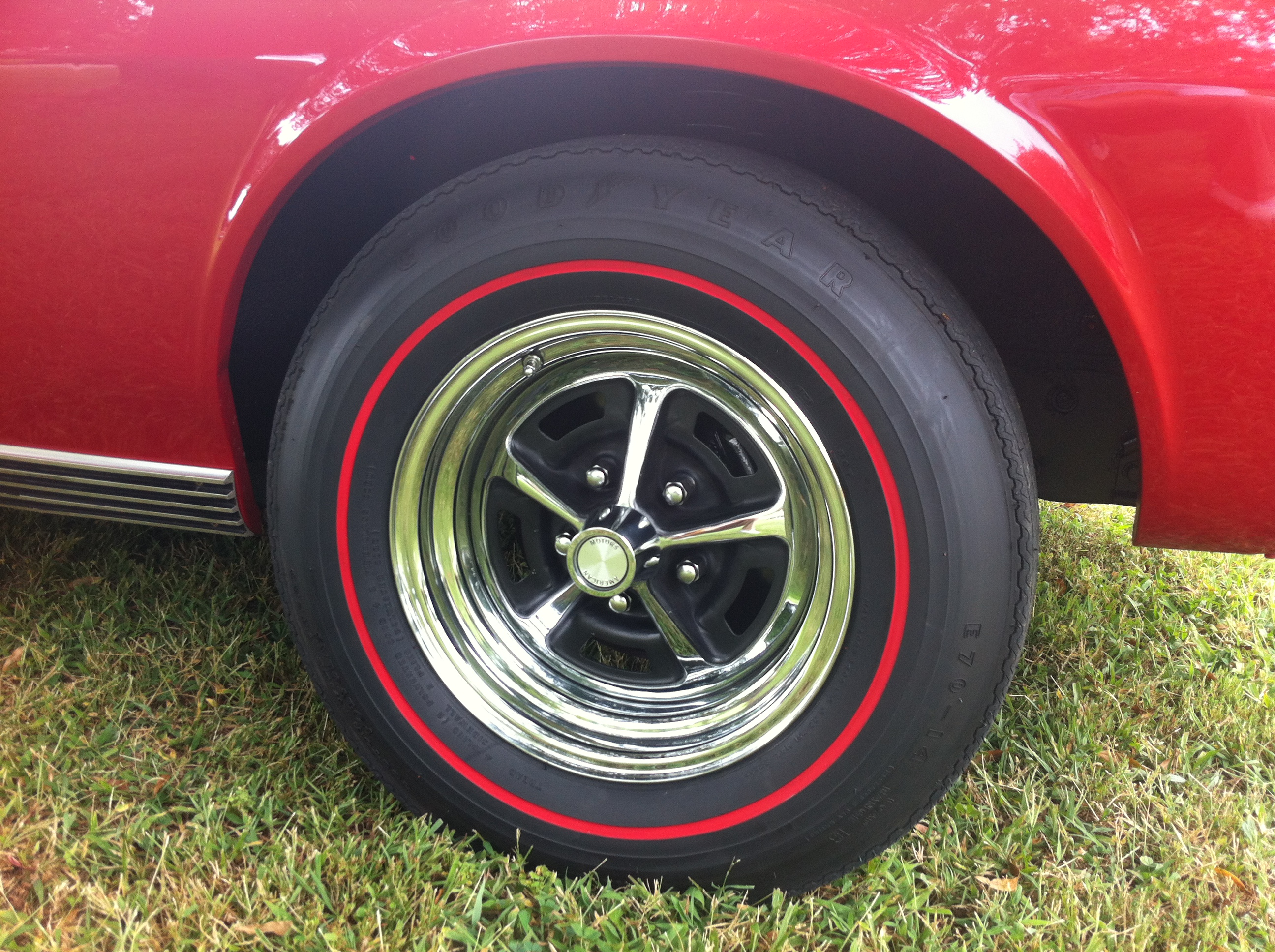
Redline tires were commonly fitted on performance cars in the late 1960s

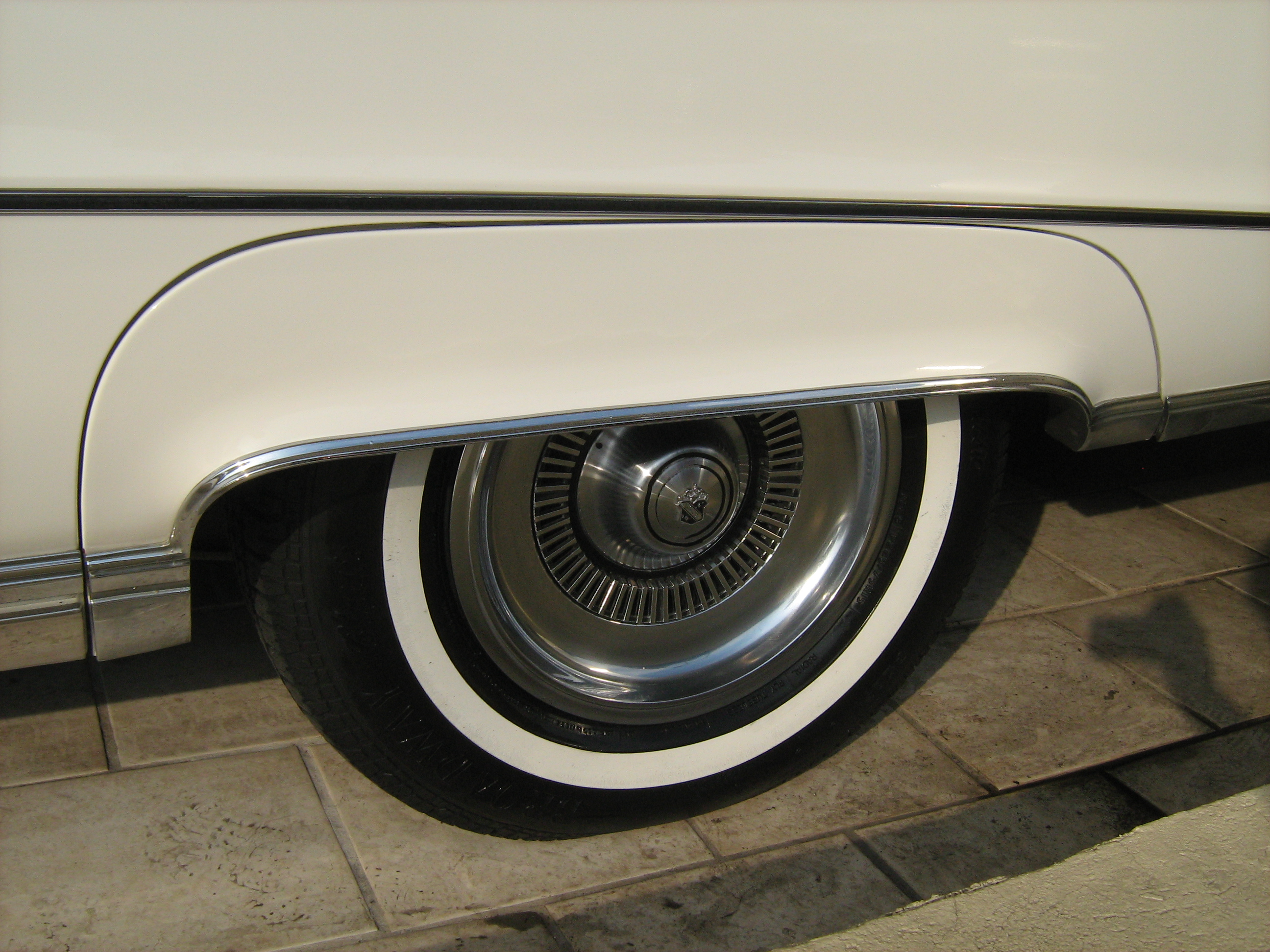
Buick Electra with white stripe tire partially covered by a fender skirt

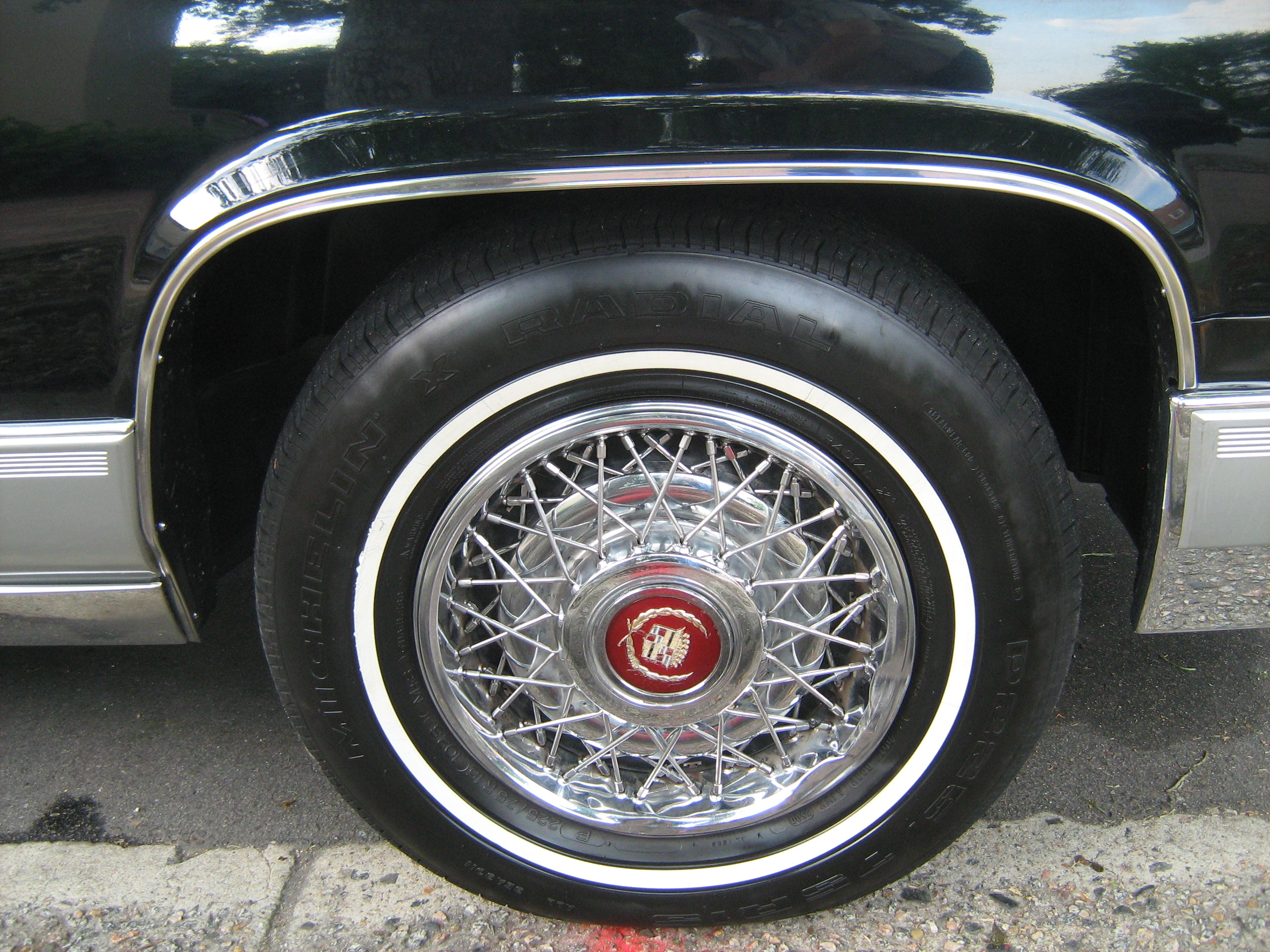
Narrow stripe white wall tires were common throughout the 1970s and into the early 1980s, some luxury carmakers still offered them late into the 1990s

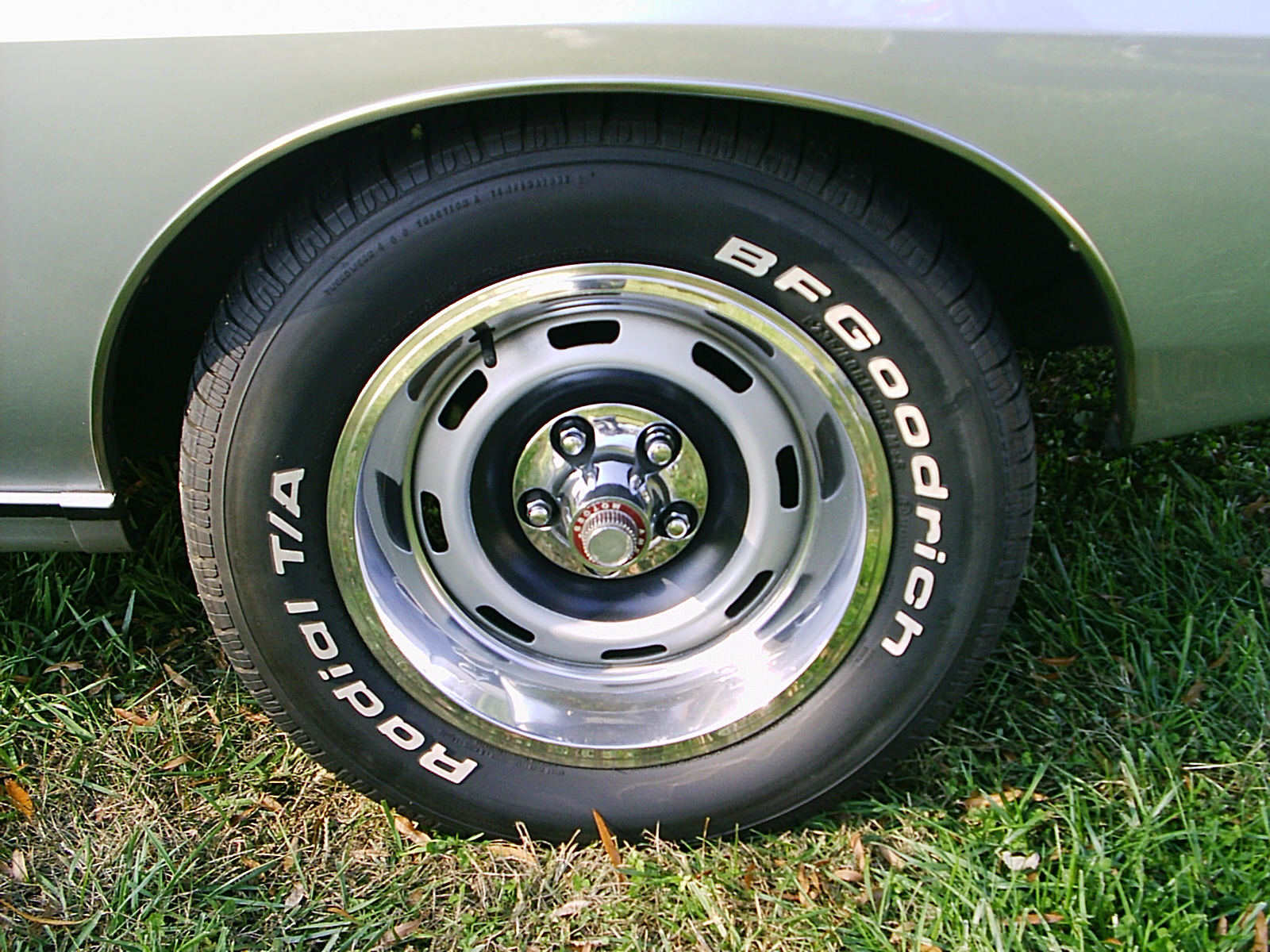
A variation with white letters on the sidewall found on muscle car tires, these are still used on modern SUVs
