= Vogue Tyre =

American company providing custom luxury tires, wheels, and car accessories

Vogue Tyre and Rubber Co.
- Type: Private
- Founded: 1914; 112 years ago Chicago, Illinois, U.S.
- Founder: Harry Hower
- Headquarters: Chicago, Illinois, U.S.
- Area served: United States
- Key people: Greg Hathcock (President); Kevin Goyak (Executive Vice President)
- Products: Automotive tires, wheels, and other tire accessories
- Number of employees: 100
- Website: www.voguetyre.com

Vogue Tyre and Rubber Co., also known as Vogue Tyre, is an American company providing custom luxury tires, wheels, and car accessories. The company was founded in 1914 in Chicago, Illinois, by Harry Hower and then in 1940, sold to Lloyd O. Dodson who remained its chairman until his death in March 1996. Vogue Tyre invented the whitewall and patented the gold stripe in the 1960s.

Vogue Tyre has provided custom built tires to professional sports players and movie celebrities, like Gary Cooper, Marion Davies, Mervyn LeRoy, Dolores del Río, Paul Whiteman, Kid Rock and Snoop Dogg.

== History ==
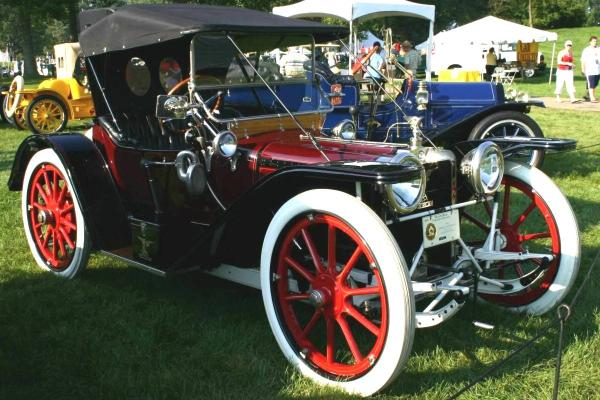
1913 American Underslung featured all white tires

=== Early history: 1913–1960 ===
Harry Hower, a chauffeur in the Chicago area in the early 1900s, got into the tire business and proposed an idea about the whitewall to the Woodbury family. By 1918, the Woodburys and Harry were in business as the Vogue Tyre Company. Over the decades, celebrities and notable people have used Vogue Tyre products on their vehicles with Vogue whitewall tires.

In 1928, Lloyd Dodson contracted with Vogue Tyre owners Harry Hower and Margaret Woodbury to begin selling whitewall tires. When the Great Depression hit in 1929, he began selling upscale tires to the local entertainment industry. In 1942, Dodson bought Vogue Tyre and remained its chairman until his death. A selection of these products and list of notable customers are displayed below:

=== Expansion: 1960 to present ===
Lloyd Dodson started his tire business in 1923 and became the exclusive distributor of Vogue Tyres for the western United States. He bought the Chicago-based company during World War II and remained active in the business until his death, serving as chairman of the board of directors for the last ten years of his life.

=== Recent history ===
- Vogue Tyre acquires some assets of E&G Classics to create E&G Corporation LLC, a new company.

- Hip hop duo Macklemore and Ryan Lewis shoot the music video for their song "White Walls" in a Vogue Tyre warehouse and explicitly mention the company and their tires in the song.

== Timeline ==
- 1914 — Harry Hower founded Vogue Tyre
- 1918 - 1919 — Harry Hower and the Woodburry family create a new tire design called the Whitewall.
- 1926 — Vogue expands to the West Coast and Dodson Limited becomes distributor in Los Angeles.
- 1930 — The great depression - Motion pictures stars adopt Vogue Tyres. Dusenberg owners become primary clients.
- 1938 — Goodyear acquires Vogue Tyres. Kelly-Springfield Tire Company accepted Mr. Hower's offer and got involved in the production of Vogue Tyres.
- 1942 (December) — Dodson Limited acquires Vogues Tyre.
- 1965 - 1970 — Vogue introduces the Twin Air Preserver Gold Streak Tyre and the Gold Puncture Control Pad.
- 1970 - 1975 — Vogue introduces the Wide Track Glass Belt and later the Brougham Gauntlet custom built steel safety tires.
- 1975 - 1980 — Kevlar (a.k.a. Aramyd) is invented by Dupont and integrated into Vogue Radials.
- 1992 — Vogue introduces the custom built Twin Tread Touring Tyre.
- 2000 — Vogue introduces CBR IX.

== Awards and recognition ==
- "Consumer digest best buy for passenger car tires" awards in 1993,1994,1995, and 1996
- Lloyd Dodson was inducted into the Tire Industry Hall of Fame in 1990.

== See also ==
- Whitewall tire
- Tire manufacturing
- List of tire companies
