= Fend =

Fend may refer to:

- Fritz Fend (1920–2000), German aeronautical engineer
  - Fend Flitzer, 3-wheeled invalid carriage designed and built by Fritz
- Kevin Fend (born 1990), Austrian soccer player
- Peter Fend (born 1950), U.S. artist and environmentalist
- FEND (Frame End), a code in the KISS (TNC) protocol

== See also ==
- Stiff-arm fend, a rugby defensive maneuver
- Fender (disambiguation)
