= Tire lettering =

Decoration on automobile tires

Tire lettering is the practice of moulding visible letters into, or drawing them on, the sidewall of an automobile's tires. In modern usage, the lettering is often big car brands or tire brands names, with custom lettering being a much smaller niche of that. It can also refer to other after market customizations to the side wall of the tire, such as the "white wall tire" look, but any color of the spectrum is available now, including "rainbow wall tires".

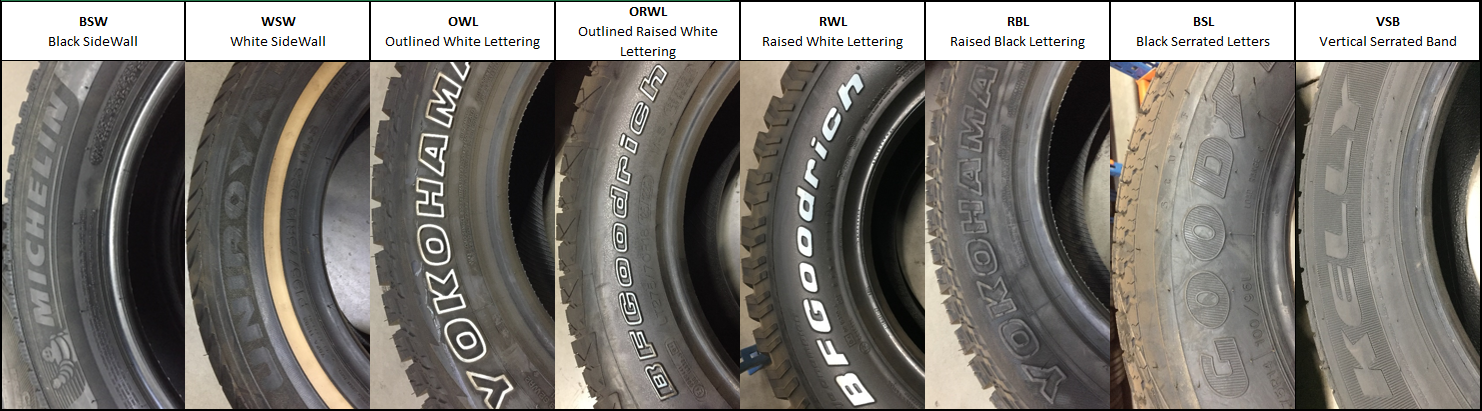
Lettering on several tires.

== Overview ==
Tyre lettering (British)/tire lettering (American) can be traced back as far as 1922, when Firestone Tire and Rubber Company launched its balloon tires on April 5, 1922., stenciling the Firestone brand name onto the tire.

In 1940, Alfred B. Poschel invented a rubber transfer method that could apply lettering to tires; however, the decal method failed to gain mass acceptance.

The stenciling method of tire lettering became popular with auto racing teams in the 1950s as a way to display the tire manufacturer on the car's tires.

Tire lettering made its way to production tires in the mid-to-late 1960s in the form of raised white letter tires and gained popularity with American muscle cars in the 1970s and 1980s until tire manufacturers stopped producing raised white letter tires on a mass scale.

Many attempted to create decals that could be applied to tires, but it wasn't until the late 2000s tire lettering came roaring back with the advent of tire decals, US-based company Tire Stickers.

== Raised white letter tires in the 1960s and 1970s ==
While tire lettering was previously drawn or painted onto the tires, in the late 1960s, tire manufacturers began producing white letter tires that were part of the tire.

Early automobile tires were made of pure natural rubber with various chemicals mixed into the tread compounds to make them wear better [4]. The best of these was zinc oxide, a pure white substance that increased traction and also made the entire tire white.

However, the white rubber did not offer sufficient endurance, so carbon black was added to the rubber to greatly increase tread life. Using carbon black only in the tread produced tires with inner and outer sidewalls of white rubber, which is where whitewall tires came from.

Later, entirely black tires became available with white sidewalls being covered with a somewhat thin, black colored layer of rubber. By compressing the white rubber through the letter cutouts in the black outer layer, it gave the effect of raised white letter tires.

Mickey Thompson claims the first raised white letter tires in 1970, but many manufacturers put out similar raised white letter tires in the late 1960s and early 1970s, including Goodyear and Firestone.

== Tire lettering resurgence with tire decals ==
With tire manufacturers no longer producing raised white letter tires on a mass scale, the advent of tire decals came about.

Initially, it was the tire manufacturers themselves who made the first serious attempts with both Goodyear and Firestone inventing versions, in 1987 and 1990, respectively, that added a significant processing difficulty and expense, halting their production.

Independent companies tried all sorts of different materials and methods to produce a durable and effective decal, including laminate and adhesive layers to the tire sidewall prior to thermal transfer of thick, cured rubber articles cut, but nothing gained mass-market acceptance.
