= Quarter panel =

Body panel of an automobile between a rear door and the trunk

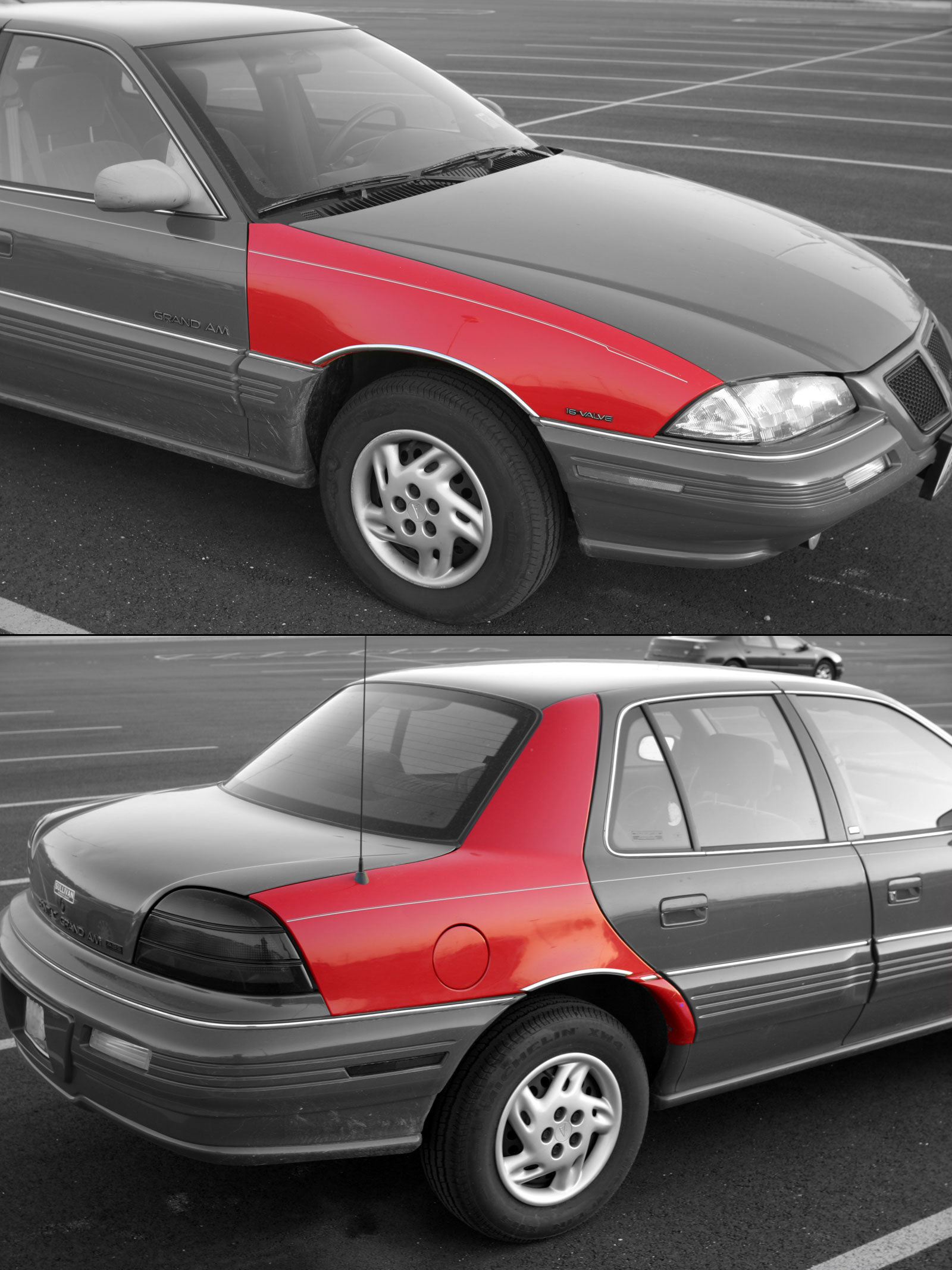
(In red) 1990's Pontiac Grand Am sedan fender (top) and quarter panel (bottom)

A quarter panel (British English: rear wing) is the body panel (exterior surface) of an automobile between a rear door (or only door on each side for two-door models) and the trunk (boot) and typically wraps around the wheel well. The similar front section between the door and the hood (bonnet) is called a fender (front wing), and may sometimes also be referred to as a quarter panel. Quarter panels are typically made of sheet metal, but are sometimes made of fiberglass, carbon fiber, or fiber-reinforced plastic.

A quarter panel is typically a welded-on component of the unibody structure. Replacement of a sheet metal quarter panel typically requires it to be cut off the vehicle and a replacement part to be welded (or sometimes bonded) to the vehicle. Due to the high amount of specialized labor, a quarter panel may often be repaired rather than replaced by hammering the damaged area to a relatively flat surface, and then applying a body filler to smooth out the damaged area to match the original surface. The panel is then usually painted and often clear coated.

== See also ==
- Injection molding
- List of auto parts
- Quarter glass
