= Fenter =

Fenter is a surname. Notable people with the surname include:

- Frank Fenter (1936–1983), South African music industry executive
- Gray Fenter (born 1996), American baseball pitcher
- Paul Fenter, American physicist

== See also ==
- Fender (surname)
- Fetter (surname)
