= Fender (vehicle) =

Part of an automobile, motorcycle, or other vehicle body that frames a wheel well

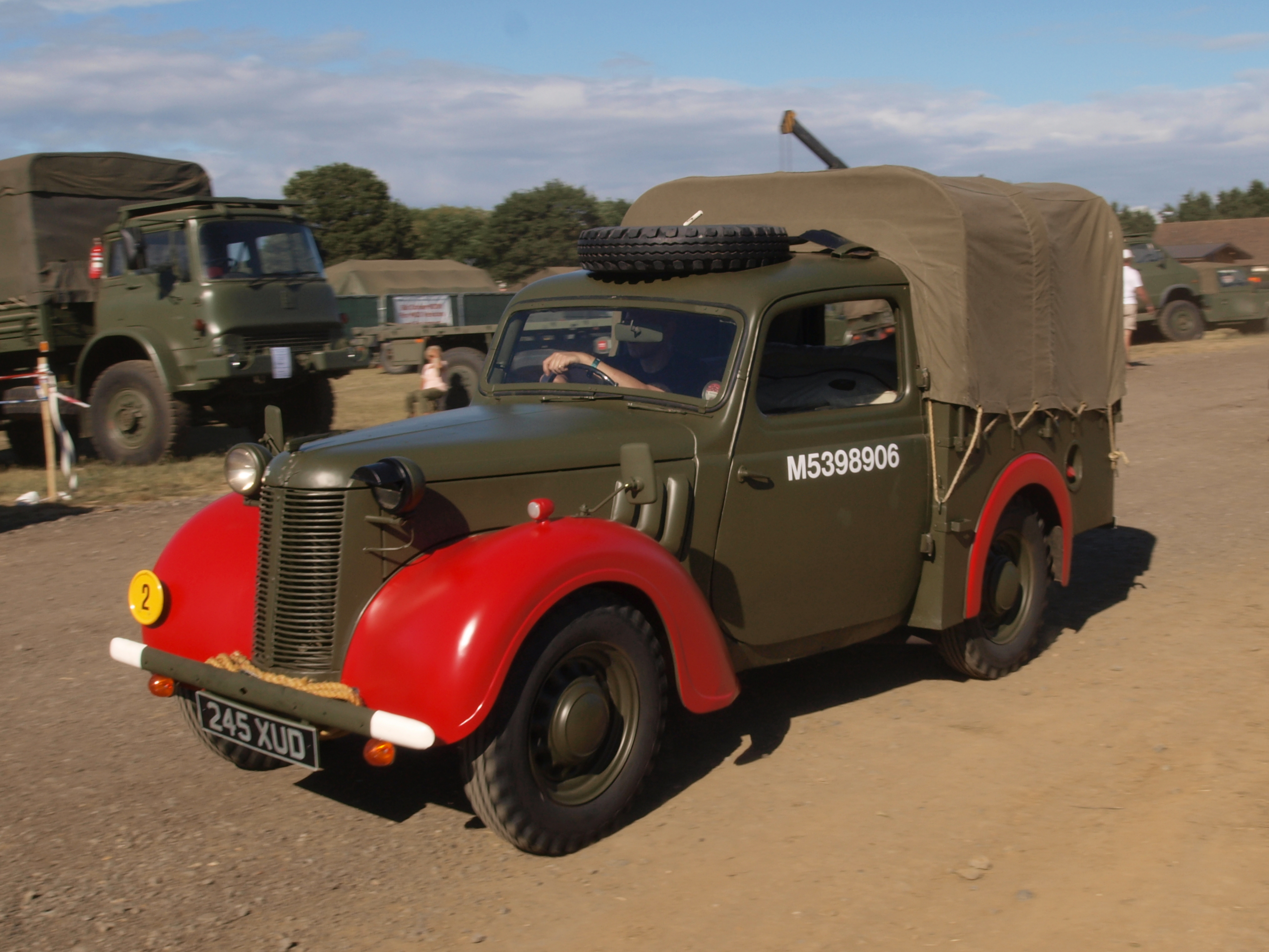
Austin 10 with red fenders

A fender is a part of an automobile, motorcycle or other vehicle body that frames a wheel well (the fender underside). Its primary purpose is to prevent sand, mud, rocks, liquids, and other road spray from being thrown into the air by the rotating tire. Fenders are typically rigid and can be damaged by contact with the road surface.

Sticky materials, such as mud, may adhere to the smooth outer tire surface, while smooth, loose objects, such as stones, can become temporarily embedded in the tread grooves as the tire rolls over the ground. These materials can be ejected from the tire's surface at high velocity as the tire imparts kinetic energy to the attached objects. For a vehicle moving forward, the top of the tire rotates upward and forward and can throw objects into the air at other cars or pedestrians in front of the vehicle.

In British English, the fender is called the wing. (This may refer to either the front or rear fenders. However, in modern unibody vehicles, rear fenders may also be called quarter panels.) The equivalent component of a bicycle or motorcycle, or the "cycle wing" style of wing fitted to vintage cars, or over tires on lorries which is not integral with the bodywork, is called a mudguard in Britain, as it guards other road users – and in the case of a bicycle or motorcycle, the rider as well – from mud, and spray, thrown up by the wheels.

In modern Indian and Sri Lankan English usage, the wing is called a mudguard. However, the term mudguard appears to have been in use in the U.S. at one point. The American author E.B. White, in his October 1940 Harper's essay "Motor Cars", refers to "...mudguards, or 'fenders' as the younger generation calls them."

In the United States, a minor car accident is often called a "fender bender".

== Trucks and automobiles ==
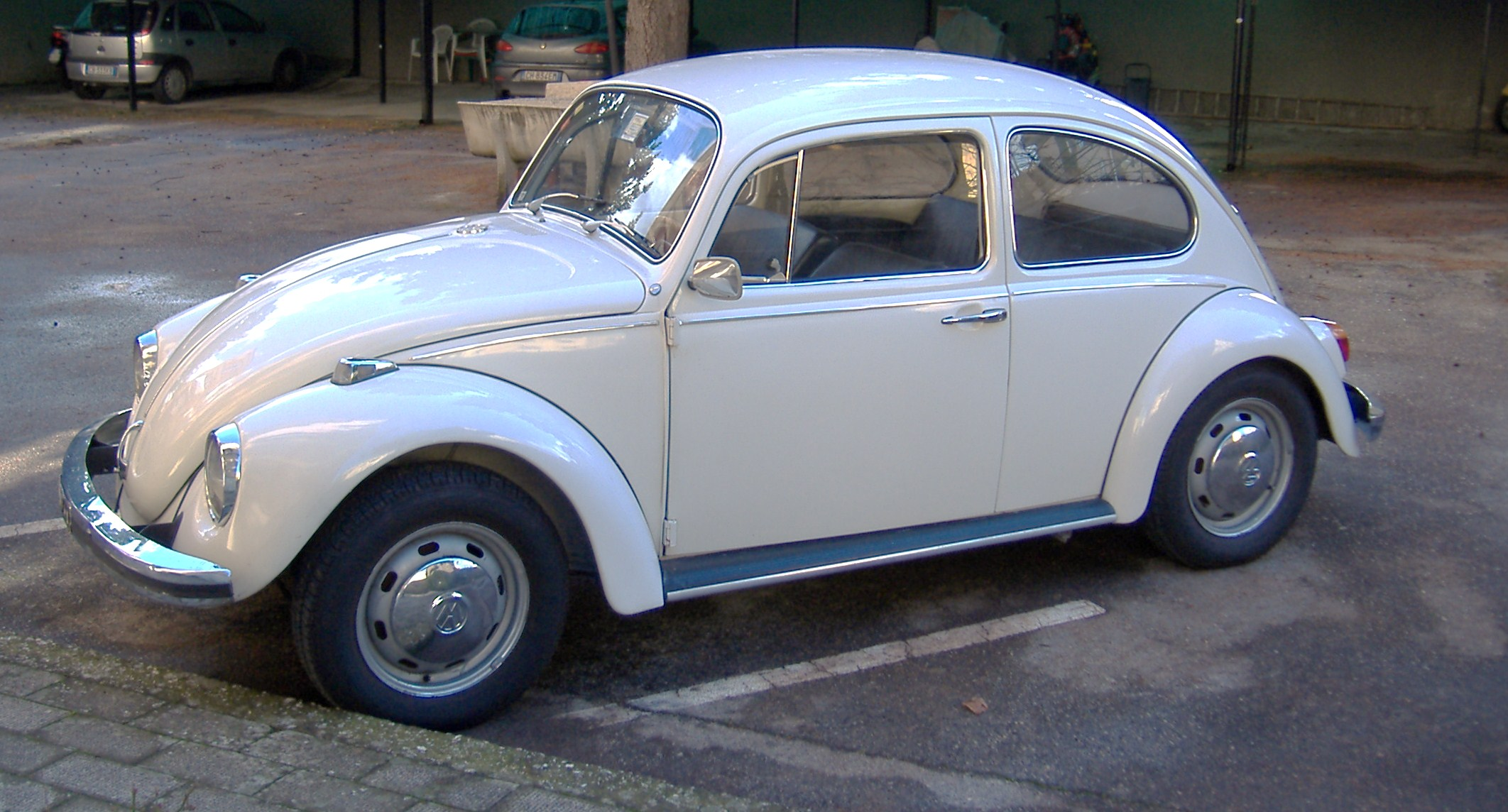
Bolt-on front and rear fenders on a Volkswagen Beetle

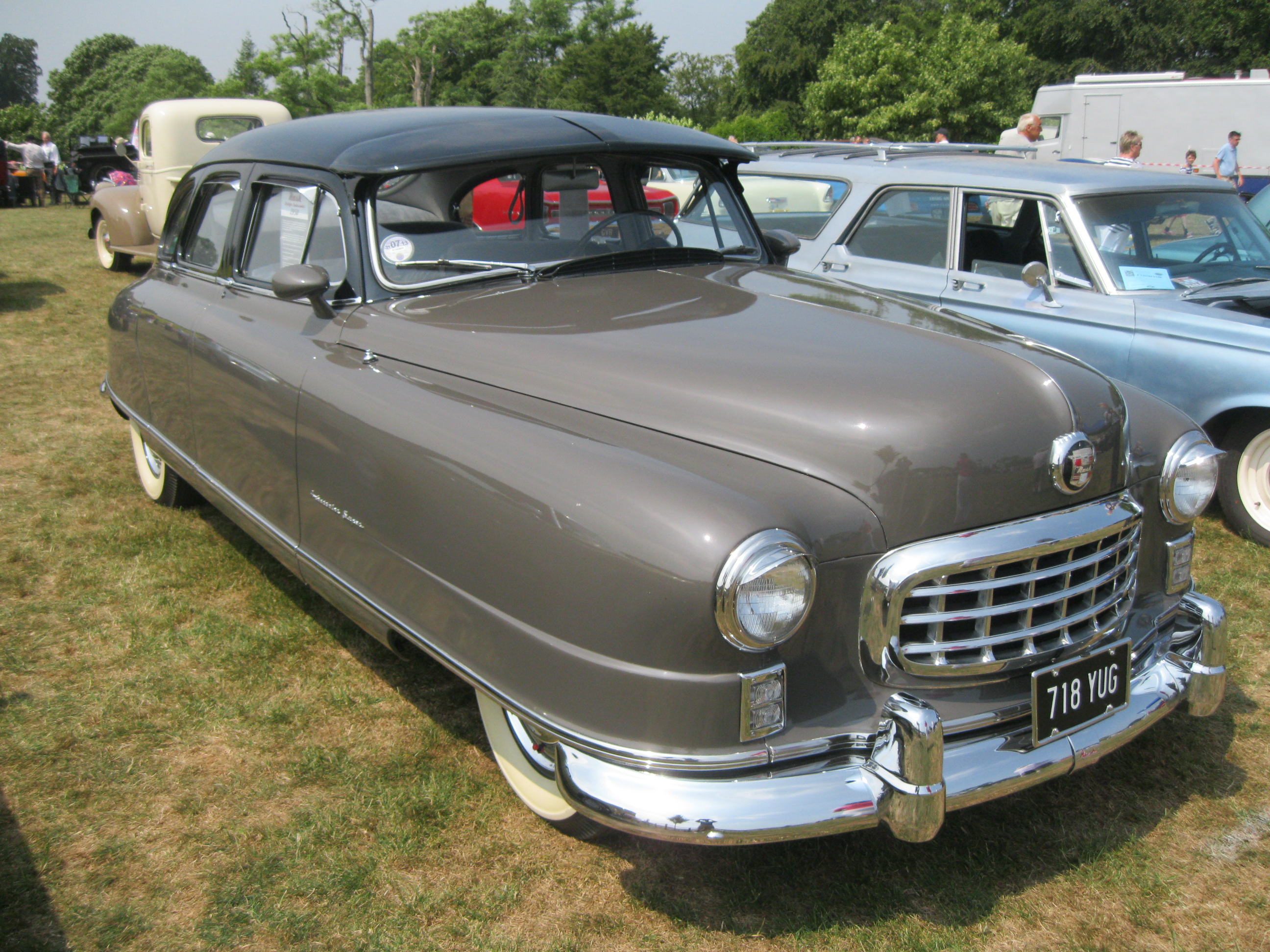
Fender enclosing the front wheels on a Nash Ambassador

Early automobile fenders were set over the wheels to prevent mud, sand, and dust from being thrown onto the body and the occupants. Fenders typically became a more integral part of overall auto bodies by the mid-1930s. In contrast to the slab-sided cars, the Volkswagen Beetle had real bolt-on fenders over both its front and rear wheels.

In current US auto industry nomenclature, only the panels over the front wheels are usually called fenders. The auto industry changed from rear fenders bolted onto a quarter panel to an enlarged welded-on quarter panel that fulfilled both functions. This resulted in one piece where there had previously been two, and the name of the larger welded piece, the quarter panel, survived the consolidation. Quarter panels are at the rear, with an exception made for dual rear-wheel trucks, where the panel at the rear is called a fender. For vehicles with a narrow car body that exposes the tire, the fender is an exposed curve over the top of the tire. For wide-body vehicles that cover the tire, the fender forms the wheel well surrounding the tire and is not directly visible from above the car body.

The fender's openings for the wheel wells tend to be much larger than the tire's diameter because they accommodate suspension travel and must be large enough to allow the full range of tire motion on the suspension without touching the interior of the wheel well. The streamlined 1949 Nash 600 and Ambassador design were the first to feature fenders that enclosed the front wheels. More elaborate designs include fender skirts for enclosing the outside edge of the wheel well, and stylized pontoon fenders for exposed fenders.

The bolted panel that covers the wheel on dual-rear-wheel pickup trucks is called a fender. A pickup truck with a separate bed but without bolt-on fenders has a bedside, which performs the function of a fender. When the side of the bed is welded to the cab, as with the Cadillac Escalade and Chevrolet Avalanche, it is called a quarter panel.

While the standard of bolted versus welded applies typically, some exceptions exist. Although attached by welding, the panels over the front wheels on cars such as the early 1960s Lincoln Continental, the Corvair, and the early-1960s Chrysler Imperial are called fenders. Similarly, even though bolted on, the panels covering the rear wheels on the Saturn S series are called quarter panels.

An aftermarket pickup truck accessory is fender flares, which block mud and stones or cover rust. Manufacturers sometimes use them on models with wider tires than basic models. Using this method, the manufacturer can provide the needed tire coverage without producing a different fender, bedside, or quarter panel for what may be a low-production model.

Fender flares are used on SUVs, pickup trucks, off-road vehicles, and sports cars. They either come with a vehicle as standard equipment or are added later as an aftermarket accessory. Fender flares are often made of fiberglass or ABS plastic to provide flexibility and lighter weight; however, some trucks and SUVs have metal fender flares to ensure better durability. There are three common styles of fender flares: OE style (narrow flares with smooth surfaces), bolt-on (wider fender flares with exposed bolts), and Cut-Out (oversized flares that require a fender trim). The most important characteristic of a fender flare is the width, as it shows the tire coverage. Common fender flares are 1–8 inches (2.5–20 cm) wide.

=== Cycle wing ===
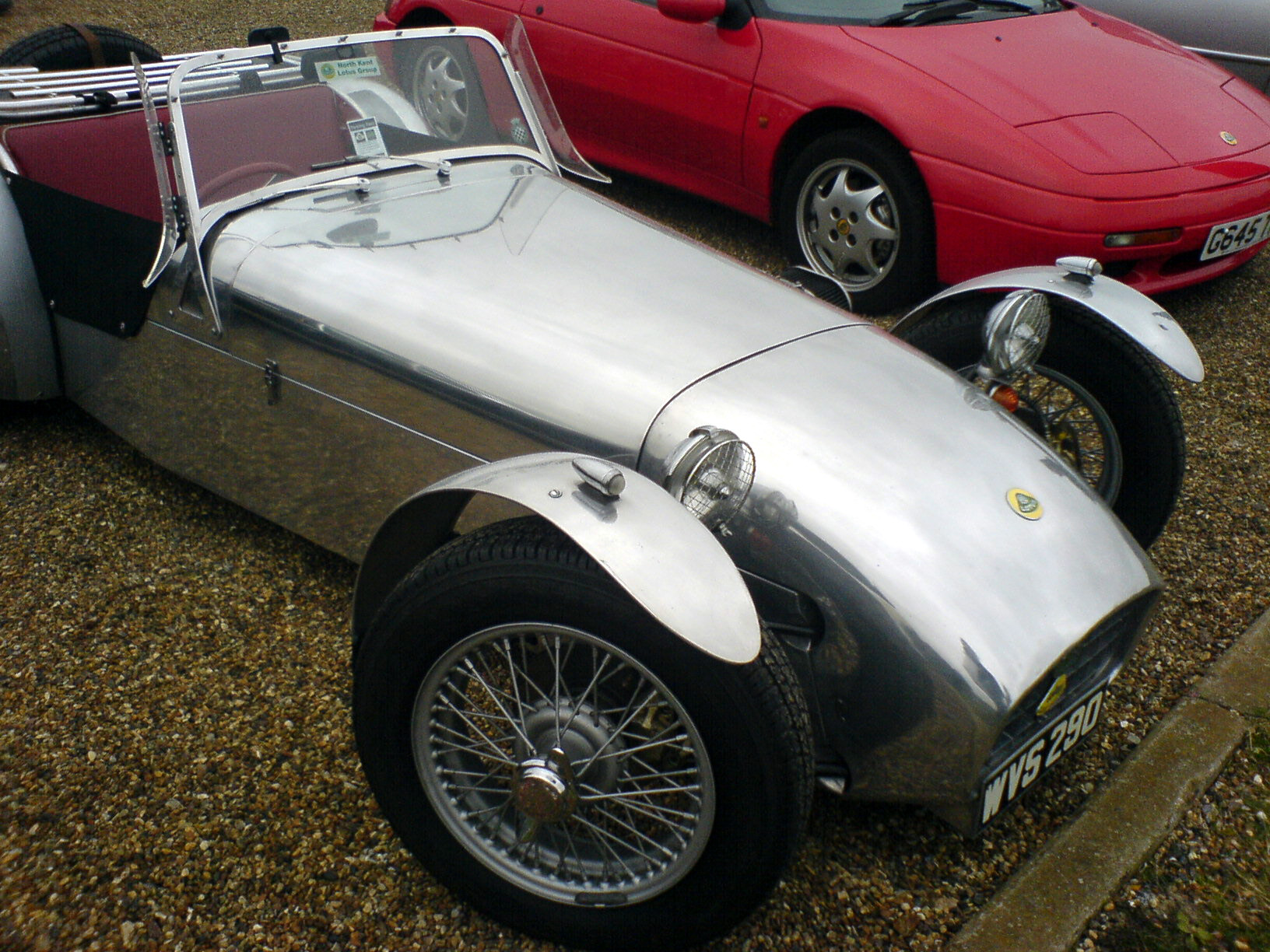
Cycle wings on a Lotus 7 Series 1, 1957 to 1960

Certain types of cars with narrow bodies, such as the Lotus and later Caterham Seven or the Allard J2, use what are called cycle fenders in the US or cycle wings in Britain, for their resemblance to those used on bicycles. They are attached to the wheel suspension and remain at a fixed distance from the tire regardless of wheel motion. They can, therefore, be much closer to the tire than fixed wheel wells. This was popular on early Classic Trials cars because the fenders were lightweight and allowed for a thin, streamlined body. They persist on cars wanting a "vintage" look.

== Bicycles and motorcycles ==
=== Bicycles ===
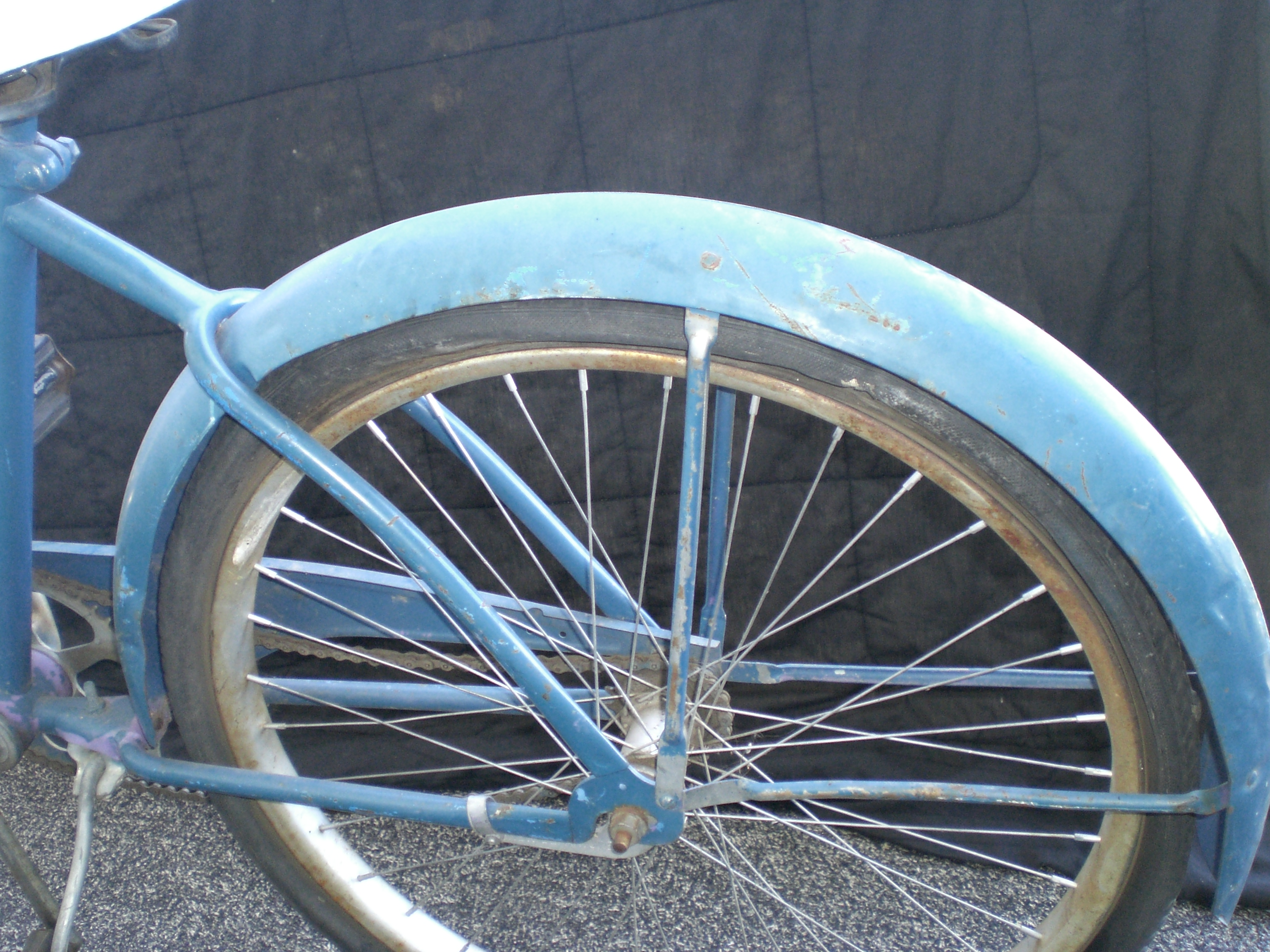
A bicycle fender

There are original manufacturer-designed and aftermarket generic fenders (mudguards) for bicycles that can be fitted to most bicycle frames. These catch and redirect road spray thrown up by the tires, allowing the rider to remain clean. They are not common on bicycles in the more car-dependent English-speaking countries, since bikes in these countries tend to be sports-oriented, with minimal clearance between tires and frame tubes for fenders, or were ridden only in mild conditions. However, a few fenders are designed to be attached to the seat post. The trend towards urban biking, which has doubled in the past decade, led to a production, import, and use boom in utility bikes. European utility bicycles, traditional roadsters, serious touring bicycles, and beach cruisers are nearly always fitted with fenders.

=== Motorcycles ===
In the UK, a motorcycle is legally required to be fitted with mudguards. While motorcycles are invariably fitted with mudguards, only touring cycles generally have fully functional mudguards. Some machines can be seen with a stub of a mudguard only a few inches long, which satisfies the legal requirements but does not provide any protection from thrown mud and spray.

Sporty-styled or racing motorcycles sometimes come with or have added as an aftermarket accessory, a "hugger" rear fender, attached to the rear swingarm and very close to the tire rather than attached to the rear subframe and away from the tire. Conversely, the practice of removing the front fender and reducing the size of the rear fender produced the bobber customization style of the 1950s onwards.

== See also ==
- Curb feeler
- Fender skirts
- List of auto parts
- Mud flap
- Quarter panel
- Wing mirror

== General and cited references ==
- Motor's Crash Estimating Guide October 1972, Vol. 4, No. 10
- Motor's Crash Estimating Guide June 1971, Vol. 3, No. 6
