= Fender skirts =

Special rear wheel covers or spats as used in cars of the 1950s

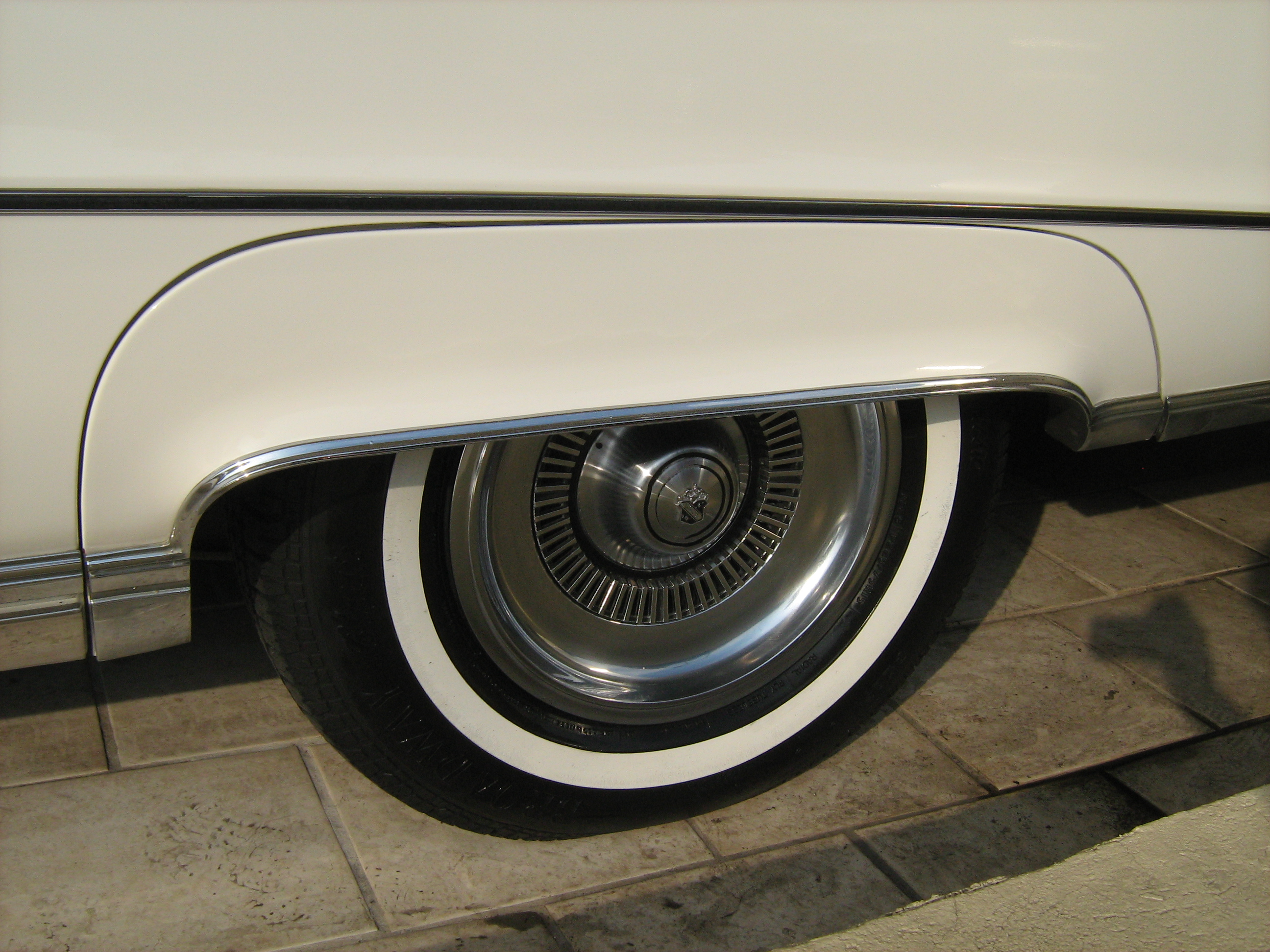
Rear wheel partially covered by a detachable fender skirt on 1969 Buick Electra 225

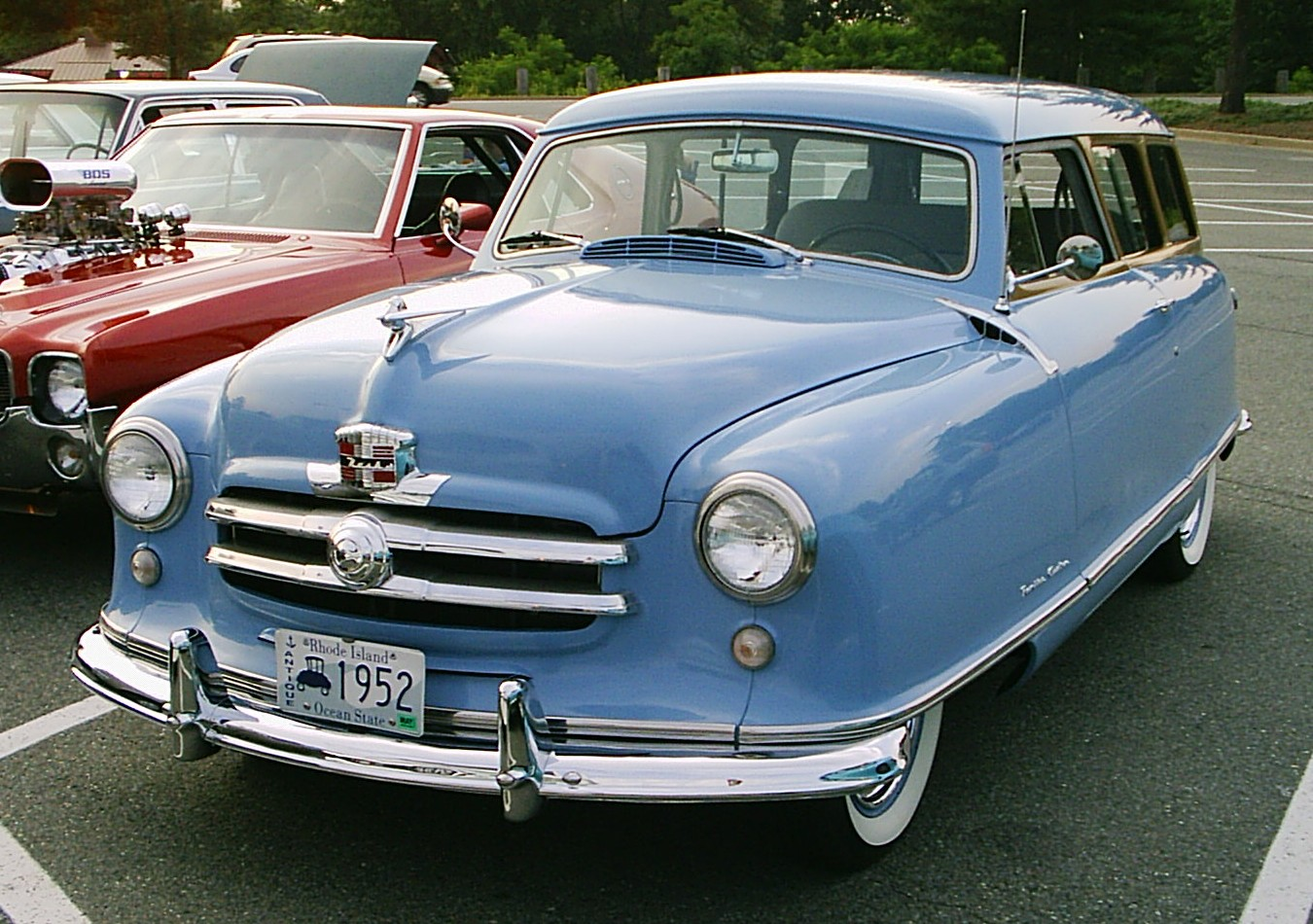
1952 Nash Rambler non-detachable front and rear fender skirts

1986 Citroën CX

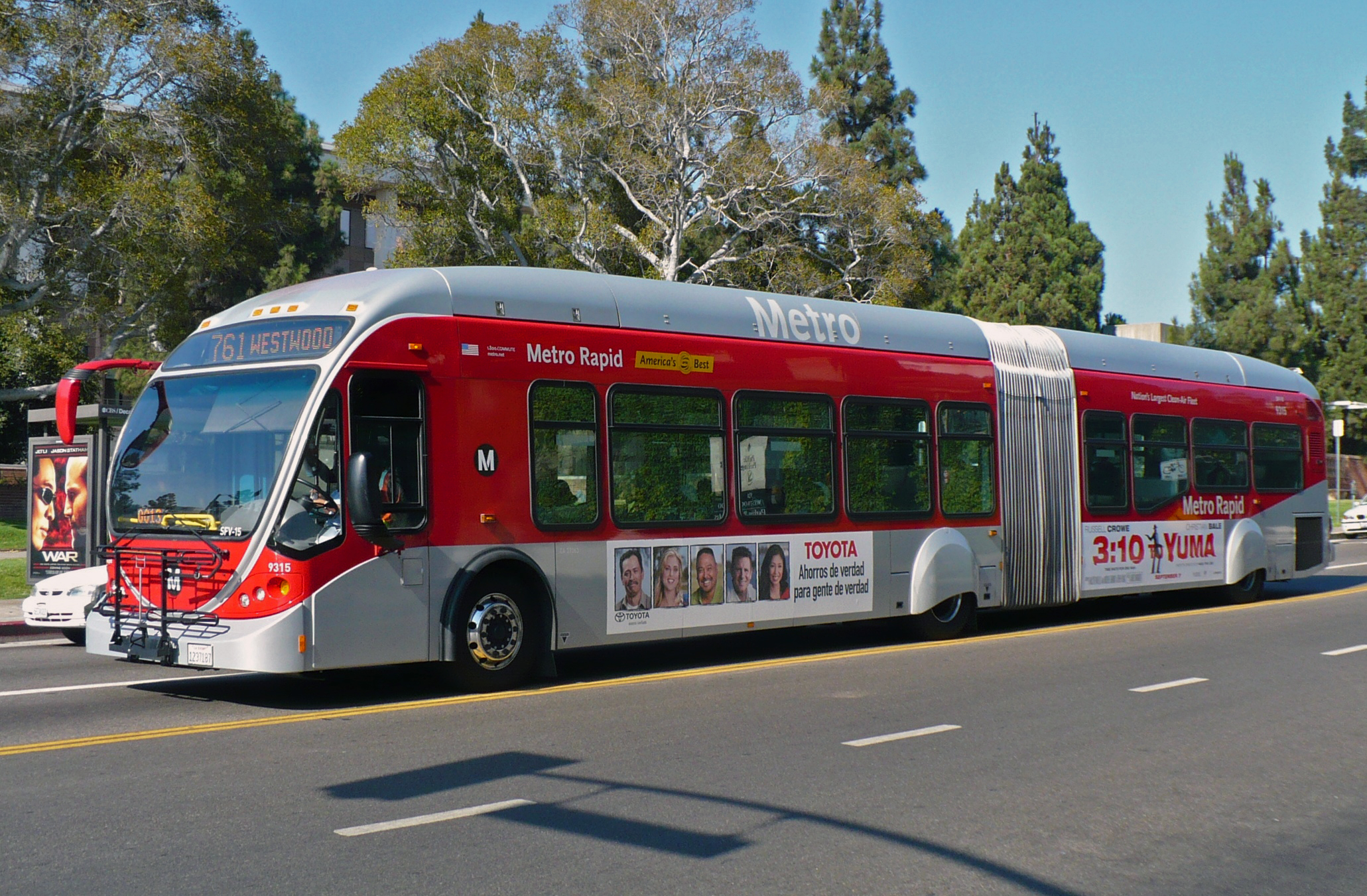
Los Angeles city bus

Fender skirts, also known as spats in Australia and the United Kingdom, are pieces of bodywork attached to or integrated into a vehicle's fender that cover the upper portions of its wheels. While most commonly found on rear wheels, some designs have featured them on all four wheels. Fender skirts serve aesthetic and aerodynamic purposes and are generally detachable to facilitate tire changes and the installation of snow chains.

== Functions ==
The primary functions of fender skirts are to enhance a vehicle's visual appeal and improve its aerodynamic efficiency. By enclosing the wheel well, fender skirts create a smoother surface for airflow, preventing air from becoming trapped and creating turbulence within the wheel housing. This reduction in drag can contribute to improved fuel economy, particularly at higher speeds.

While most applications historically focused on the rear wheels, some automakers have incorporated integral fender skirts over the front wheels.

Nash Motors was a pioneer in this regard. Utilizing wind tunnel research undertaken during World War II, Nash applied aerodynamic principles to its post-war designs, most famously on the 1949 through 1954 Nash "Airflyte" series. These cars featured a highly streamlined, "bathtub" shape with enclosed front and rear fenders that blended seamlessly into the body sides. This design significantly contributed to their low drag coefficients at highway speeds. The compact-sized Nash Rambler (1950–1954) adopted these aerodynamic enclosed fenders. A challenge with enclosed front wheels is accommodating their pivot for steering. Nash addressed this by designing the front wheels with a narrower track [54.7 in (1,389 mm)] compared to the rear [59.7 in (1,516 mm)], claiming that this asymmetry did not negatively affect stability.

Fender skirts can have functional benefits beyond aesthetics and aerodynamics. Some municipal buses, such as in cities like Los Angeles, are equipped with fender skirts for safety. These can prevent objects on the road from slipping underneath the tires, reducing the risk of accidents or damage.

In General Motors' parts and accessories documentation, fender skirts are often called "fender shields." The 1955 Ford Thunderbird introduced a variant called "fender shields" that incorporated an edge molding and a gravel shield as part of its design.

== History ==
The concept of covering wheels for streamlining dates back to early automotive design. Frank Lockhart for example, used early versions of what he called "pants" on his 1928 Stutz land speed record attempt car for their aerodynamic effect.

Factory production of fender skirts began with the 1932 Graham-Paige. This was the transition of this aerodynamic feature from experimental vehicles to mass-produced automobiles.

The streamlined aesthetic, popularized by designers like Amos Northup (who also introduced V-shaped radiators and sloping "beaver-tail" rear ends), became increasingly common after 1933. Fender skirts quickly became a distinctive styling element, contributing to the perception of cars as "glorious floating boats, classy and elegant."

Fender skirts often appeared with other period styling cues like whitewall tires. The extent of skirt wheel coverage also varied over time. Before the 1950s, it was common for nearly the entire upper portion of the rear tire to be covered. By the 1960s, skirts tended to cover only a portion of the top of the tire and were reserved mainly for top-tier luxury models.

From the mid-1960s until 1976, fender skirts were a prominent feature on many full-size General Motors luxury cars, including the Chevrolet Caprice, Oldsmobile 98, Buick Electra, Pontiac Bonneville, and Cadillac Fleetwood, DeVille, and Calais models. The Cadillac Eldorado also featured fender skirts from 1971 through 1974.

Fender skirts largely disappeared with the downsizing of American cars in the late 1970s. For example, after 1977, only the Pontiac Bonneville retained them among downsized GM cars. While the Oldsmobile 98 briefly brought them back in 1980, they vanished from all standard GM cars by 1985. A brief resurgence occurred with the front-wheel-drive Cadillac Fleetwood models from 1989 until 1993. General Motors incorporated fender skirts into the design of their full-size sedans, the Chevrolet Caprice, Buick Roadmaster, and Cadillac Fleetwood, for the 1991 through 1996 model years, harking back to a more classic aesthetic.

In European automobile design, Citroën notably used fender skirts on nearly all models produced between 1950 and 1990, most prominently in the DS, 2CV, Ami, GS, SM, BX, and CX.

== Applications ==
While their widespread use on mainstream passenger cars declined significantly after the 1970s, fender skirts have periodically reappeared on vehicles prioritizing aerodynamic efficiency or unique styling.

The General Motors EV1 electric car, designed with a strong emphasis on fuel economy, prominently featured rear fender skirts. The first-generation Honda Insight (released in 1999) and the Honda Clarity (2016 model) also incorporated fender skirts to minimize drag and maximize efficiency. The limited-production Volkswagen XL1 (2013), an ultra-efficient plug-in hybrid, also utilized them for aerodynamic benefits.

In the world of Kustoms (customized automobiles), fender skirts remain a popular accessory. They are used to create a "chopped" or "slammed" look, contributing to a sleek and often vintage aesthetic by visually lowering the vehicle and enclosing the rear wheels.

Fender skirts are available as aftermarket accessories for some modern cars, such as the Chrysler PT Cruiser and Volkswagen Beetle, allowing owners to personalize their vehicles with a retro touch. However, their aesthetic contribution to modern car designs is sometimes debated, with critics suggesting they can appear "tacky, strange, outlandish, or just plain ugly" on contemporary vehicles.

Despite their potential for drag reduction, General Motors identified several practical challenges with widespread fender skirt implementation in their research:

- Achieving a precise and aesthetically pleasing fit between the tires and the body without excessively narrowing the wheel track or pulling out the body panels can be difficult.
- Removable skirts add complexity and cost to manufacturing due to their attachment mechanisms.
- Reduced airflow around the wheels can lead to higher tire temperatures and pressures, potentially affecting tire performance and longevity.
