= Janet S. Fender =

American physicist

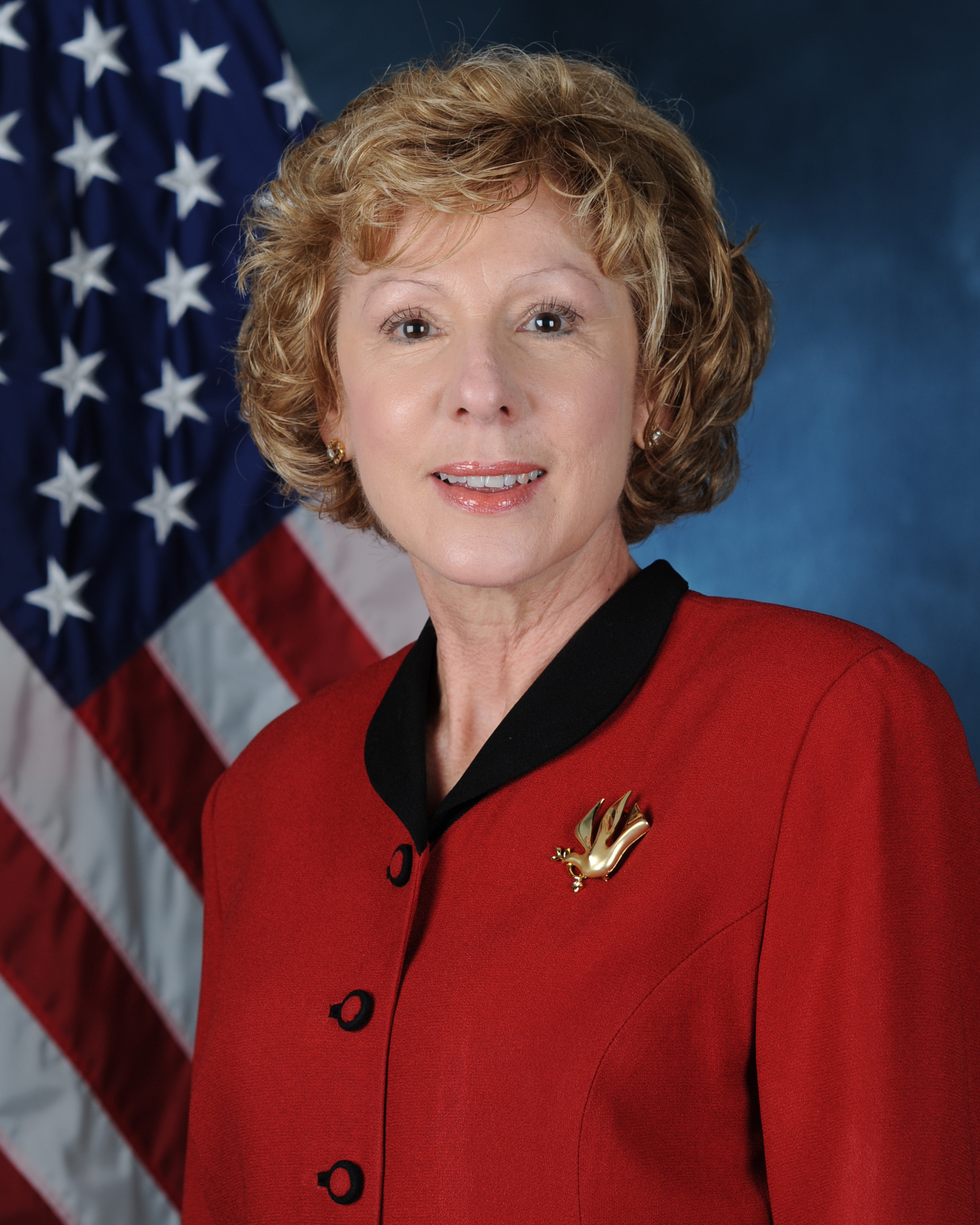
- Janet S. Fender
- Scientific career
- Fields: Physics

Janet Sue Fender is an American physicist. She is the Scientific Adviser to the Commander, Air Combat Command, Langley Air Force Base, Virginia, USA. She was president of the Optical Society of America in 1997.

== Education ==
Fender was awarded a BSc in physics and astronomy by the University of Oklahoma in 1973. She went on to gain a Masters and a PhD in optical sciences at the University of Arizona.

== Career ==
Following graduation from Arizona, Fender joined the Air Force Weapons Laboratory at Kirtland Air Force Base, New Mexico. She rose to become chief scientist for space vehicles and senior scientist for advanced imaging at the laboratory in 1997. In 2004 she was appointed scientific adviser to the commander at Air Combat Command, Langley Air Force Base, Virginia.

== Awards ==
- Presidential Distinguished Service Rank Award (2015)
- Fellow of the Optical Society of America (1994)
- Fellow of the International Society of Optical Engineers (1988)
- Distinguished Alumni, University of Oklahoma (2009)
- Distinguished Alumni, University of Arizona
- Sigma Pi Sigma (National Physics Honor Society)
- Gold, Silver, Bronze Corporate Cup athletic medals
- Air Force Scientific Achievement Award
- American Defense Preparedness Association Crozier Prize
- Coty Most Extraordinary American Woman of the Year
- New Mexico Federal Woman of the Year
- Who's Who Worldwide, Science and Engineering, Fourth Edition
- Coyote Classic Rally Navigator Award
- International Commission on Optics Awards
- Special Act Award, U.S. Air Force

== See also ==
- Optical Society of America
