= Automotive part retailer =

Type of retail business

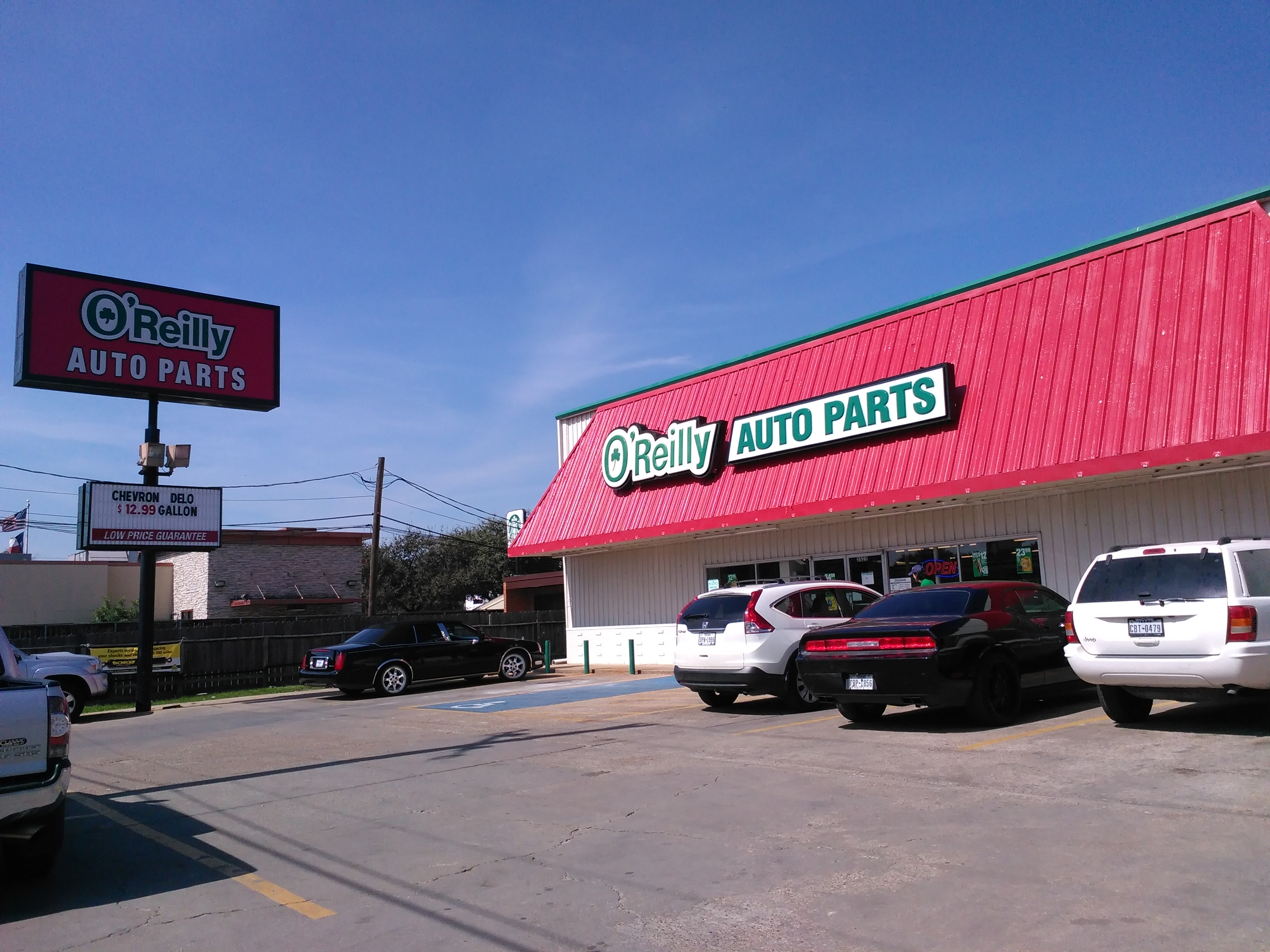
Exterior of an O'Reilly Auto Parts store in Houston in Texas, United States.

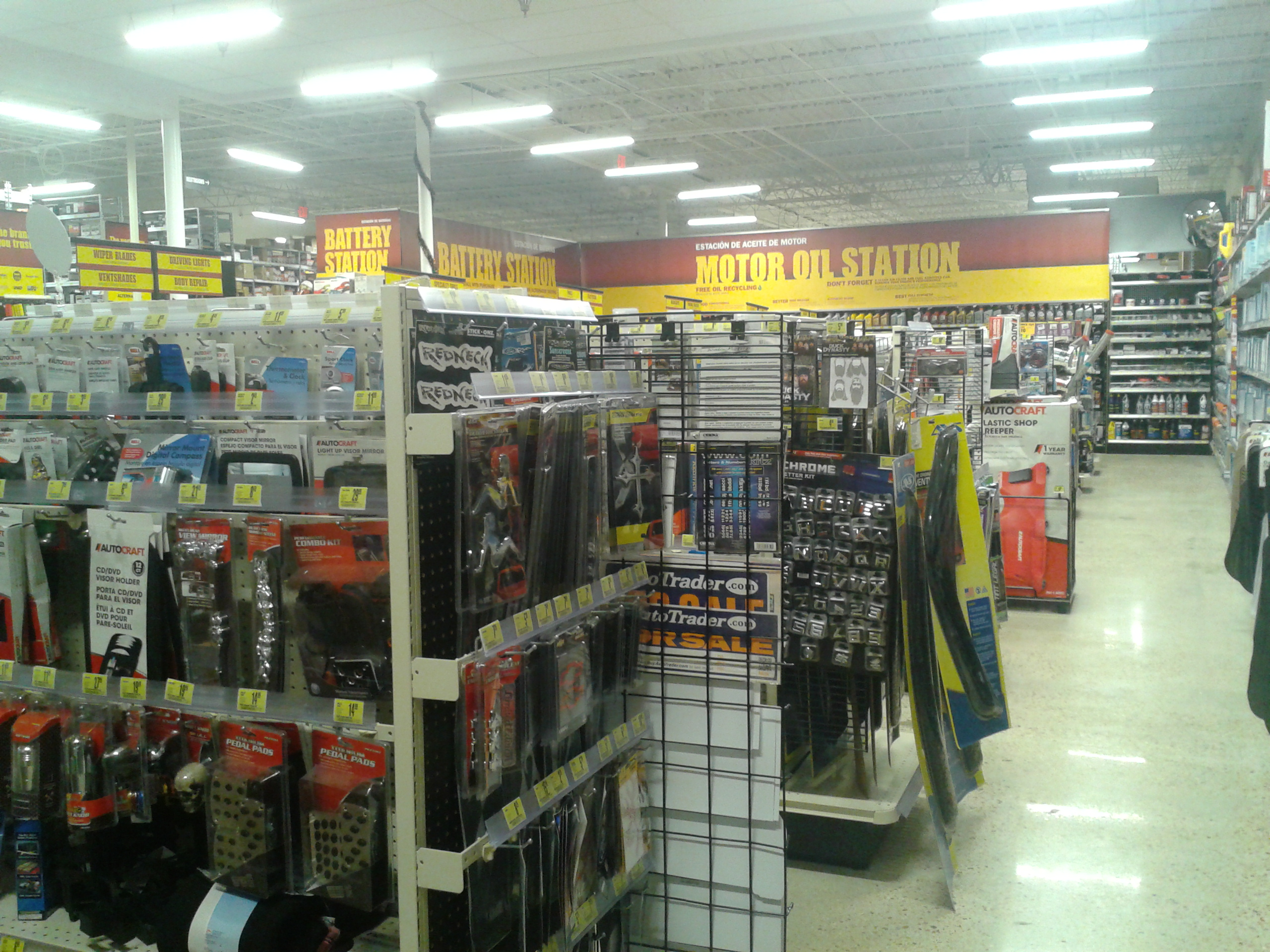
Interior of an Advance Auto Parts store in Virginia, United States.

An automotive part retailer is a retail business that sells automotive parts and related accessories to both consumers and professional repair shops, through physical stores and websites. Some automotive parts retailers also offer customer support and services related to automotive maintenance and repair.

The sector is often dependent on consumers' disposable income, and therefore affected by business cycles and economic conditions.

== History ==
The automotive parts industry in the United States began with the proliferation of automobiles as a common method of transportation. As the industry grew, small businesses came to be replaced by chains and retail networks. General Motors was the first company in the industry to begin franchising in 1893. In 1909, Western Auto became the first retailer of aftermarket automotive parts in the United States. In 1928, Genuine Parts Company as a distributor of automotive replacement parts, industrial parts and consumer supplies. Its largest component is NAPA Auto Parts.

By the 1970s, large companies like Advance Auto Parts, AutoZone and O'Reilly Auto Parts dominated the market. Most of these also offered private label automotive products, which accounted over 50% of revenue in some cases.

Demand for automotive parts correlates with the average age of vehicles on the road, and the price of fuel. When newer cars are more expensive or there are supply chain issues, consumers are more likely to keep and repair their existing cars, or purchase older used cars that require more regular repairs. The average age of vehicles in the United States increased from the 6.5 years in 1980, to 8.5 years in 2000.

=== 2020 to present ===
Demand for auto parts can be affected by how much consumers travel for work, education and travel. During the COVID-19 pandemic, sales dropped rapidly, as did the stock price growth of many major US retailers during 2020. The subsequent increase in road travel had the opposite effect; unlike home improvement, furniture or grocery retailers, automotive parts retailers directly benefited from incremental increases in the number of consumers commuting to work or school.

Major American retailers recorded high revenue, sales figures or operating margins in 2021 as a result of this trend, despite experiencing high inflation and supply chain pressures.

The average age of a vehicle in the US reached a record high of 12.1 years in 2021. The price of gas rose sharply in 2022, causing volatility for the sector.

== By market ==
=== Africa ===
==== South Africa ====
Midas is South Africa's largest auto part retail chain, and is owned by holding company Motus. As of 2026, Midas has over 300 stores across six countries in Southern Africa. The majority are located in SA's largest cities - Cape Town, Durban, and Johannesburg.

Other South African auto part retail chains include Goldwagen, Masterparts, AutoZone, and Suburban Motor Spares (which is also owned by Motus). The country also has numerous online-only vendors.

=== Asia ===
Autobacs Seven operates in Asia, and also has stores in France.

=== Europe ===
Several retailers operate in multiple European countries, including Euro Car Parts, Motrio, Nipparts, Autodoc and Oscaro. The Asian retailer Autobacs Seven also has stores in France.

==== United Kingdom ====
Halfords is a major retailer in the United Kingdom, and owns National Tyres and Autocare and Ripspeed.

Demon Tweeks also operates in the UK market.

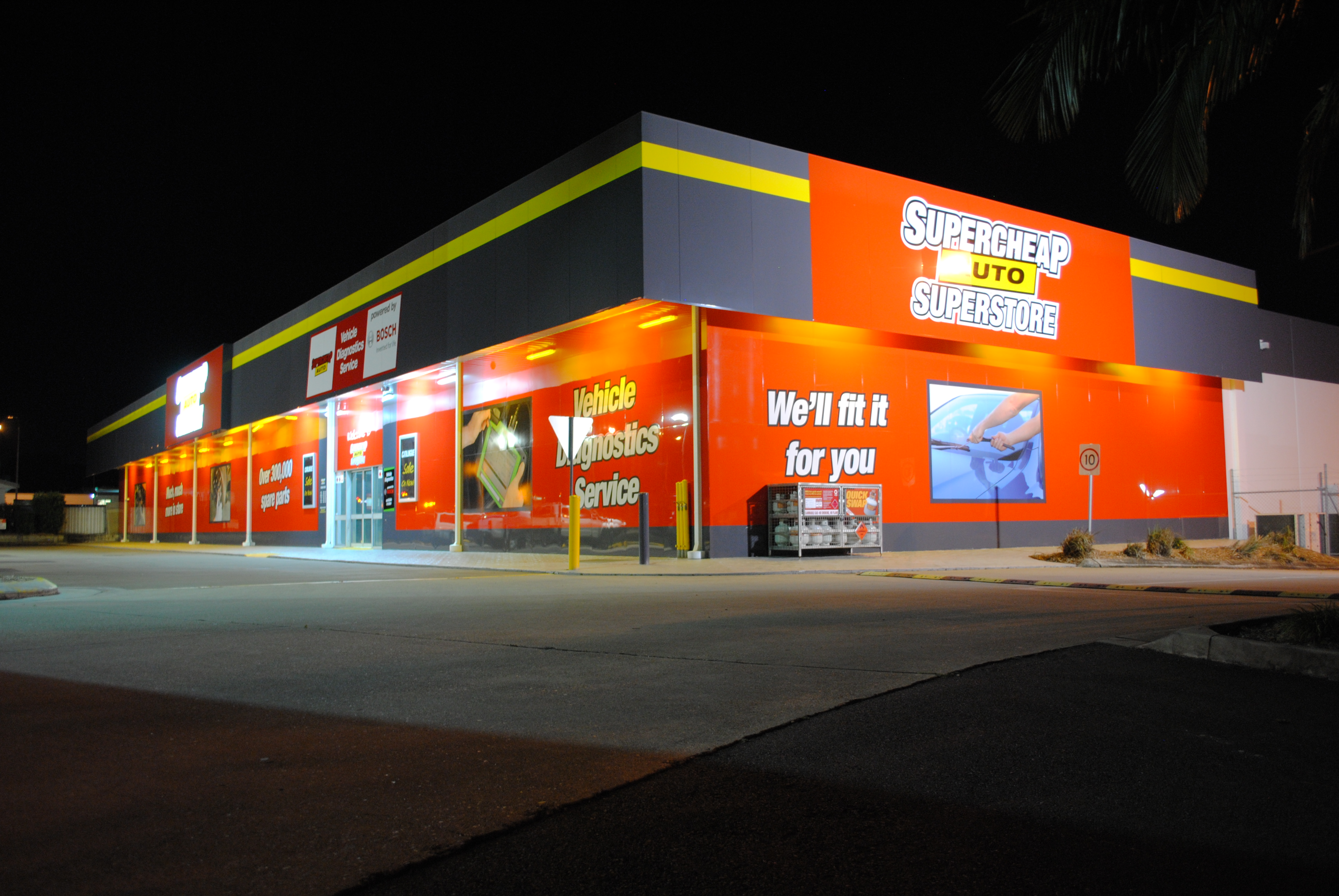
A Supercheap Auto store in Queensland, Australia.

=== North America ===
==== Canada ====
Canada's automotive part retailers include Amsoil, Fountain Tire, Integra Tire & Auto Centres, Canadian Tire (and their subsidiary PartSource) and Tirecraft.

==== United States ====
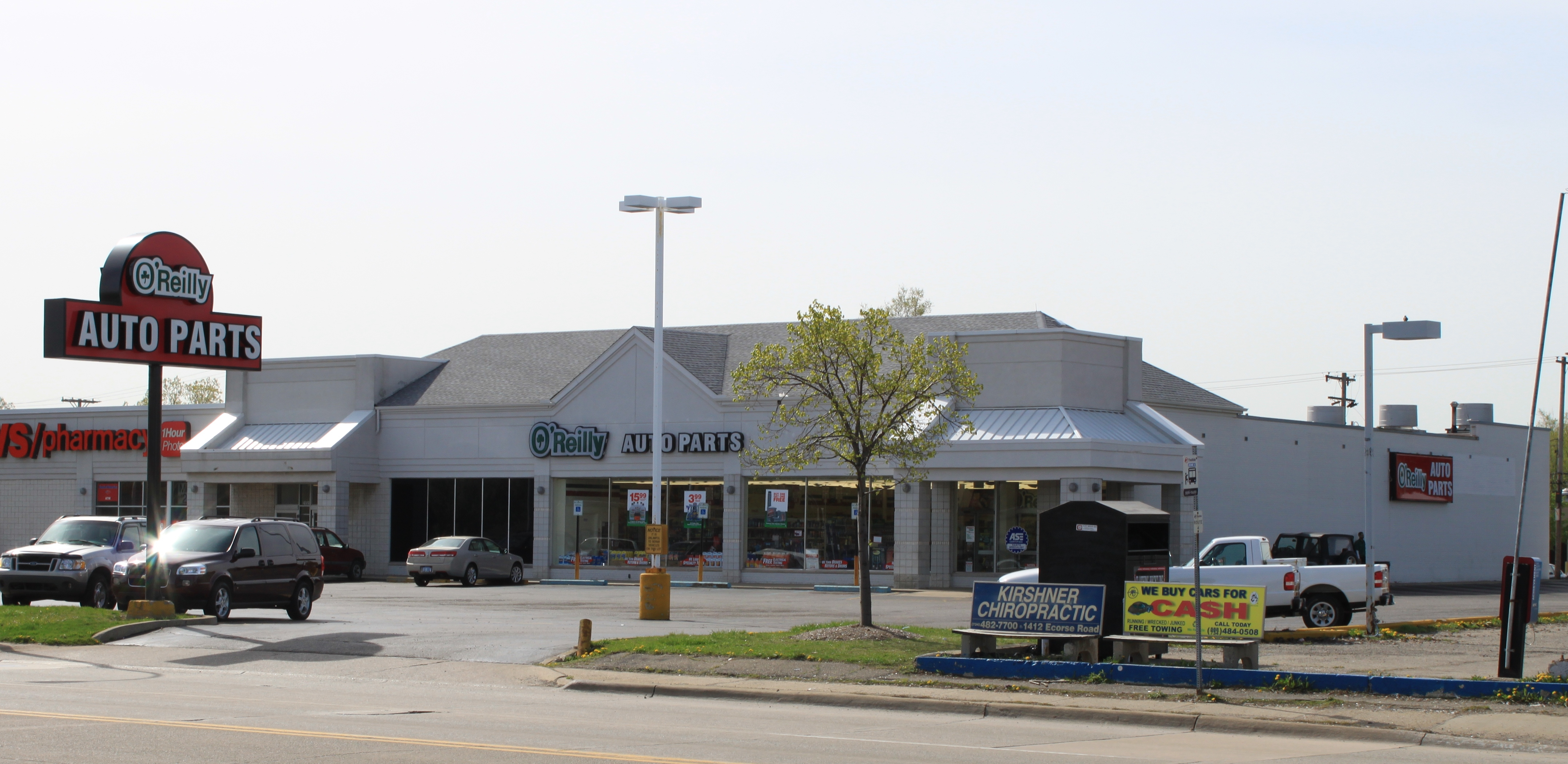
An O'Reilly Auto Parts store in Michigan, United States.

Automotive part retailing is a $300 billion industry in the United States.

O'Reilly Auto Parts, Advance Auto Parts, CarMax and AutoZone are major players in the industry.

Other retailers include:

- Allen Tire Company
- American Tire Distributors
- AmericanMuscle
- Amsoil
- Belle Tire
- Big O Tires
- Carquest
- Chief Auto Parts
- Commercial Tire
- CSK Auto
- Discount Tire
- G.I. Joe's
- Grand Auto Supply
- Grigsby-Grunow
- JC Whitney
- Jegs High Performance
- KOI Auto Parts
- Les Schwab Tire Centers
- LKQ Corporation
- McQuay-Norris
- NAPA Auto Parts
- Oscaro
- Pep Boys
- Pfadt Race Engineering
- Quirk Tires and Service
- RevZilla.com
- Rovers North
- Summit Racing Equipment
- Super Shops
- Tire Discounters
- Tire Kingdom
- Tire Rack
- Trak Auto
- Valvoline Instant Oil Change
- VIP Tires and Service
- Western Auto
- Winston Tire Company

=== Oceania ===
==== Australia and New Zealand ====
Repco and Supercheap Auto are major rivals in the Australian and New Zealand markets, targeting both consumers and trade customers.

Autobarn is a smaller competitor, but outranked the major rivals for consumer satisfaction in Australia in 2018.

Ultra Tune also has stores around Australia.

Auto One also has stores across Australia. Auto One specialises in automotive parts, accessories, and car care products for both retail and trade customers. Core Specialisations include Spare Parts that includes Engine and brake components, belts, hoses, gaskets, and filters. Car Care & Maintenance products like Oils, additives, cleaning products, paint mixing, and panel repair supplies. Vehicle Accessories that includes 4WD gear, roof racks, car audio, and seat or car covers. Electrical & Power products such as Car batteries, 12V systems, testing services, and lighting globes. Tools & Workshop products like Hand tools, air tools, and specialised garage equipment.
