= AFE =

AFE or Afe may refer to:

== Association football ==
- Afrique Football Élite, a club in Bamako, Mali
- Association of Spanish Footballers (Spanish: Asociación de Futbolistas Españoles)

== Government, military and politics ==
- State Railways Administration of Uruguay (Spanish: Administración de Ferrocarriles del Estado), Uruguay
- Afe Ichong, a political unit of the Annang people of Nigeria
- Armed Forces Entertainment, a United States Department of Defense agency
- Assembly of French Citizens Abroad, France

== Places ==
- AfE-Turm/Uni-Turm (English: AfE Tower), a demolished skyscraper in Frankfurt, Germany
- Kake Airport, Alaska, United States (FAA LID:AFE)

== Technology ==
- Active front end, in variable-frequency drives
- Advanced FLOW engineering (aFe), a manufacturer of high performance automotive parts
- Analog front-end, in electronics

== Other uses ==
- Amniotic fluid embolism, a pregnancy complication
- Authorization for expenditure, or cost, in accounting
- Putukwam language, spoken in Nigeria (ISO 639-3:afe)
