= Pfadt Race Engineering =

Pfadt Racing
- Industry: Automotive
- Founder: Aaron Pfadt
- Headquarters: Salt Lake City, United States
- Products: GM aftermarket performance parts
- Owner: Aaron Pfadt

Pfadt Race Engineering is an engineering firm situated in Salt Lake City, Utah.

== History ==
After experiencing a period of rapid growth selling Corvette parts, the company launched new suspension lines for the Camaro and Cadillac ATS. It also launched exhaust headers for the Corvette and Camaro. Under the leadership of Pfadt and the newly established Advanced Control Engineering division, the company partnered with Advanced Flow Engineering (AFE), headquartered in Corona, California.

== Awards ==
In 2011, Pfadt Race Engineering was ranked #16 on the Utah 100 list of fastest-growing companies by the Mountain West Capital Network. In 2012, Pfadt Race Engineering was ranked #59 on the same list.

== Partnerships ==
A majority of the original line was focused on C5 and C6 Corvette suspension. After gaining recognition as one of the leading Corvette suspension retailers, the company expanded its product line to include the fifth-generation Chevrolet Camaro.

In 2010, Aaron Pfadt and Johnny O'Connell introduced a new Corvette suspension line, incorporating O'Connell's signature and design input.

After getting acquired by Advanced Flow Engineering, Pfadt Race Engineering released a series of suspension components designed for BMW vehicles, including drop springs, sway bars and coil overs, which were manufactured in Corona, California. The company also introduced a suspension package for Ford Mustang vehicles.

=== Transition to AFE ===
The re-branded company began operations in August 2014 and introduced new products for BMW and Mustang.
