= Oscaro =

Online distributor of car parts and accessories

- Industry: Retail
- Founded: 2003; 23 years ago
- Founder: Pierre-Noël Luiggi
- Headquarters: Paris, France
- Products: Automotive parts
- Revenue: 320 M€ (2016)
- Number of employees: 600 (2017)
- Website: oscaro.com oscaroparts.com

Oscaro is a French e-commerce company founded in 2003. The company specialises in the sale of automotive parts from manufacturers and wholesalers. The company is headquartered in Paris and Gennevilliers and operates in France, Spain, Belgium and also in the US.

== History ==
In March 2003, Pierre-Noël Luiggi and Véronique Campbell founded Oscaro, following three years of negotiations with the Economic Interest Grouping to obtain access to their catalogue of products and technical data.

In 2005, the company reached one million euros in sales revenue. The following year, Oscaro Recambios was launched in Spain.

In October 2011, Pierre-Noël Luiggi was appointed member of the French delegation represented at G20 YES (Young Entrepreneur Summit).

In 2012, Oscaro was reported to have 1.46 million unique monthly users, according to Médiamétrie.

In October 2015, Oscaro became a shareholder of Temot International, an international buying group specialised in automotive customer service.

In April 2016, Oscaro expanded to Belgium, primarily serving its francophone community.

After opening a research centre in California in 2012, Oscaro launched its website on the US market under the name Oscaroparts.com.

== Activity ==
Oscaro specialises in the sale of automotive parts from manufacturers and wholesalers. The name OSCARO is a portmanteau of CAR bookended by the letter O, representing two wheels.

With the creation of Oscaro, its founder had high ambitions to make the website "the Google of spare auto parts".

In June 2016, Oscaro’s online catalog presented 700,000 spare part referrals to its clients from a pool of 150 suppliers. Over 8,000 packages are shipped daily.

== Infrastructure ==
Since its creation, the company’s administrative centres and warehouses have been based in Gennevilliers. It also serves as a hub for nearly 200 technicians.

In 2016, Oscaro has expanded to a second warehouse (22,000 m^{2} in size) in Cergy-Pontoise.

== Sponsorships ==
Since the company’s formative years, it has been a sponsor of sports teams and sporting events.

- World Touring Car Cup
- Sporting Club of Bastia
- CA Bastia
- Fortuneo-Vital Concept
- John Filippi (WTCC)
- 4L Trophy
- Tommy Regan (Monster Energy NASCAR Cup Series)

== See also ==
- Valtus
- Keolis
