= Max Wegner (businessman) =

German businessman (born 1987)

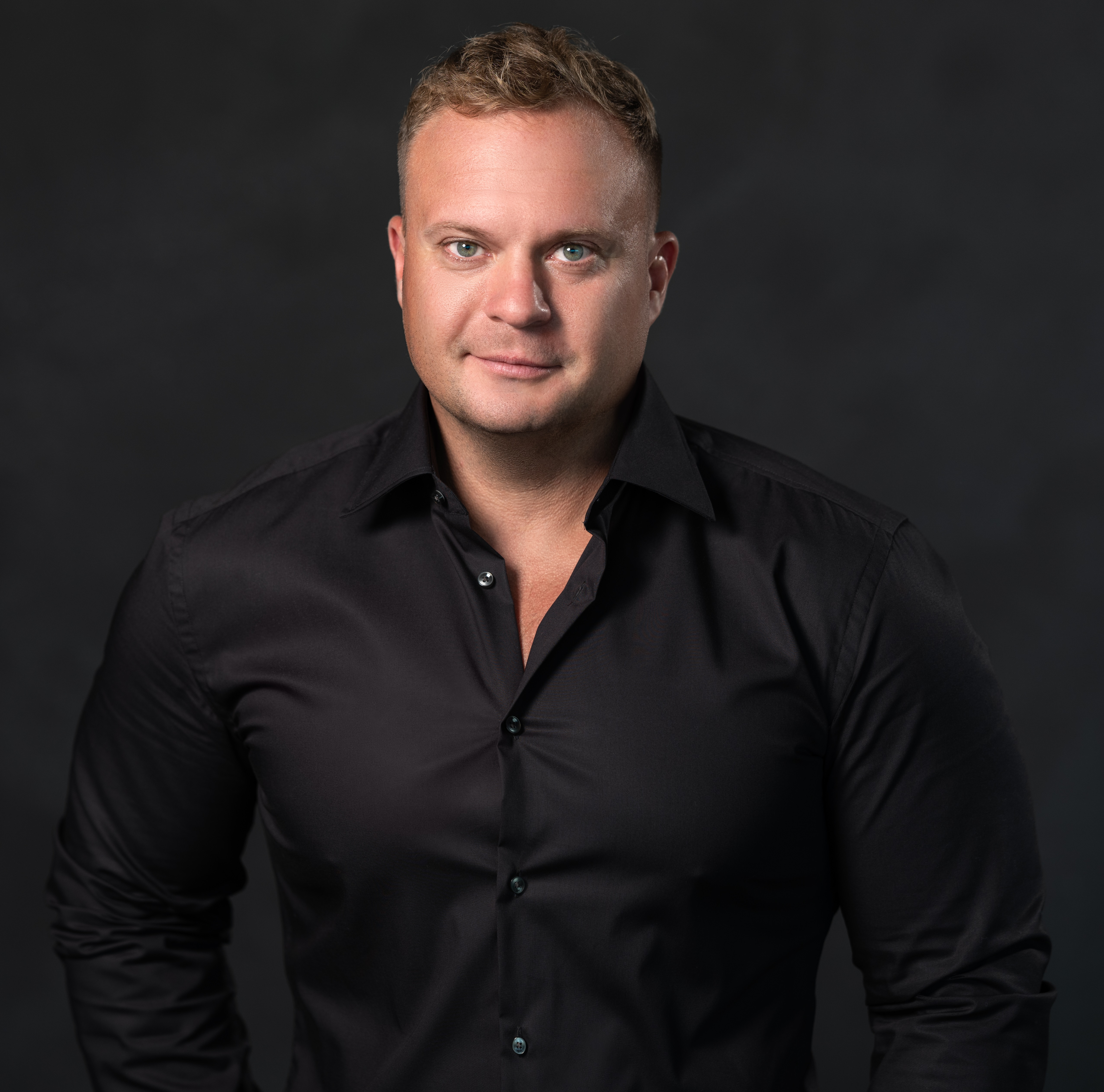
- Wegner in 2023
- Born: January 14, 1987 (age 39)
- Citizenship: German
- Occupation: Entrepreneur
- Known for: Co-founder and co-owner of Autodoc
- Title: Co-owner of AUTODOC SE
- Children: 2

Max Wegner (born 14 January 1987) is a German entrepreneur who is a co-founder and co-owner of Autodoc, an online retailer of car parts with annual revenue of over €1.5 billion. Wegner is responsible for strategy and business development and is a part of the supervisory board.

== Early life ==
Max Wegner moved to Germany in 2002. He attended a secondary school in Berlin.

== Career ==
In 2008, Wegner co-founded AUTODOC with Vitalij Kungel and Alexej Erdle. Within the company he has been responsible for strategic direction and business development. The business is wholly owned by the three founders, with Wegner and Erdle each holding 45% and Kungel 10%.

Under Wegner's leadership, AUTODOC SE has expanded internationally. Subsidiaries were opened in Moldova (Chișinău), Ukraine (Kyiv, Odesa, Kharkiv), and in Lisbon, Portugal (2023).

== Philanthropy ==
Wegner supports various charitable initiatives in Ukraine and elsewhere. He has financed social programs such as Monster Corporation and Dobry Obed, and has supported young athletes including racing driver Makar Zheleznyak and MMA fighters Askar Mozharov and Elena Kolesnik.

He has also funded IT education projects for children from large families and underprivileged backgrounds, contributed to the renovation of a football pitch in Odesa's Victory Park (2021), and sponsored the construction of a bear playground at the Odesa Zoo.

== Personal life ==
He is an active traveler and mountaineer, having climbed Mount Elbrus in the Caucasus and Mount Giluwe in Papua New Guinea. He has taken part in the "Seven Summits" mountaineering program and climbed all 7 volcanoes.
