= Valvoline =

American manufacturing company

Valvoline Inc.
- Formerly: Continuous Oil Refining Co. (1866); Ellis & Leonard
- Type: Public
- Traded as: NYSE: VVV; S&P 400 component
- Industry: Chemical manufacturing and distribution, car repair
- Predecessors: Freedom-Valvoline Company; Ashland Inc.
- Founded: September 6, 1866; 160 years ago in Binghamton, New York, U.S. (as the Continuous Oil Refining Company)
- Founder: John Ellis
- Headquarters: Lexington, Kentucky, U.S.
- Key people: Lori Flees (CEO); Mary Meixelsperger (CFO)
- Revenue: ▲US$1.71 billion (2025)
- Operating income: ▲US$390 million (2025)
- Net income: ▼US$210 million (2025)
- Total assets: ▲US$2.67 billion (2025)
- Total equity: ▲US$339 million (2025)
- Number of employees: 11,400 (2025)
- Subsidiaries: Valvoline Instant Oil Change; Valvoline Express Care
- Website: valvoline.com

Valvoline Inc. (/ˈvælvəliːn/ VAL-və-leen) is an American retail automotive services company based in Lexington, Kentucky. It licenses the name for a number of Valvoline-labeled automotive oil, additives, and lubricants. It also owns the Valvoline Instant Oil Change, Great Canadian Oil Change and Valvoline Express Care car repair chains. As of 2023, it is the second-largest oil change service provider in the United States with 10% market share and over 1,650 locations.

== History ==
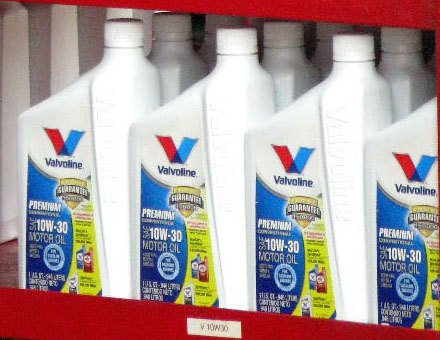
Valvoline motor oils exhibited

In the early 1860s, Dr. John Ellis, a Massachusetts-born physician, traveled to Titusville, Pennsylvania, which was the epicenter of America's nascent petroleum industry, to research crude oil as a potential medical compound. Instead, he found it to be an excellent lubricant for machinery. Ellis built his own equipment for improving the crude's lubricating qualities. In 1866, he partnered with his wife's relative, who had an oil refinery in Binghamton, New York, to found the Continuous Oil Refining Company, which produced petroleum lubricant for steam engines. Originally, Ellis named his lubricant Binghamton Cylinder Oil, but two years later, he renamed it to the simpler and more memorable Valvoline. In 1869, he moved the Continuous Oil Refining Company to Brooklyn. With his son and son-in-law, Ellis renamed the company to "Ellis & Leonard" and relocated to Shadyside, New Jersey. Valvoline received commendations by Charles F. Chandler and others at the Paris Exhibition of 1878. By the 1890s, Valvoline oil was associated with winning race cars. During the early 20th century, Valvoline was the recommended motor oil for the Ford Model T.

In 1949, Ashland Inc. purchased the Freedom-Valvoline Company.

By 2016, Ashland's Valvoline subsidiary accounted for about 37% of the parent company's annual revenue. Valvoline completed an initial public offering on the New York Stock Exchange on September 22, 2016, ahead of Ashland spinning off Valvoline as an independent company on May 5, 2017.

On August 1, 2022, Saudi Aramco announced the acquisition of Valvoline's lubricant unit for US$2.65 billion.

== Automobile and motorcycle partnerships ==
Valvoline is an official recommended fuel and motor oil for all General Motors marquees including Chevrolet, Buick and Cadillac and also all-Honda Motor Company group brands including Honda and Acura for automobiles only as well as Honda for motorcycles only.

== Sponsorships ==
=== NASCAR ===
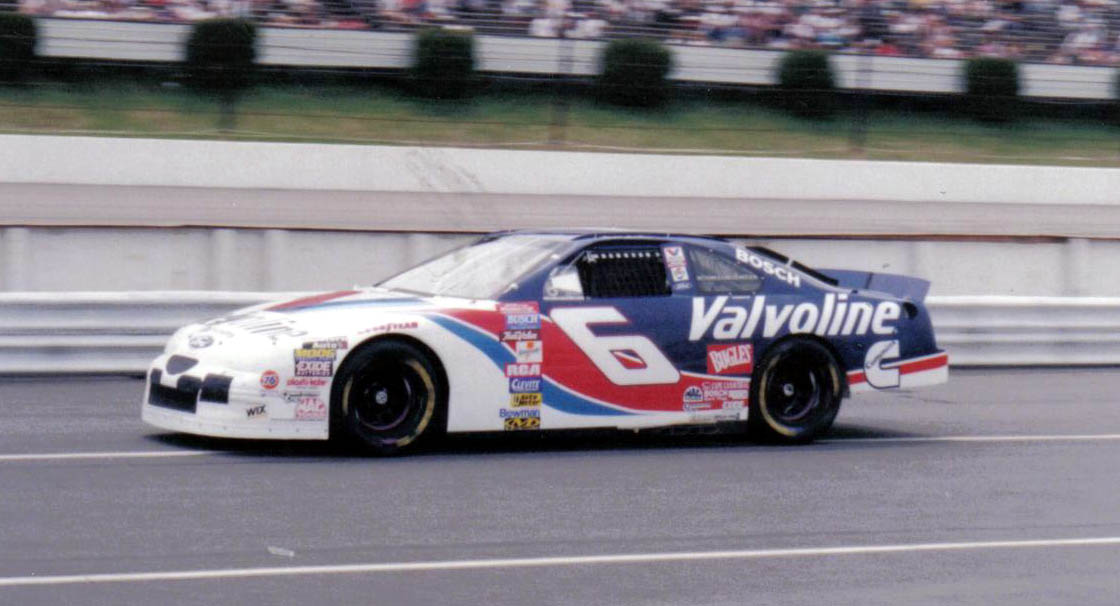
Mark Martin running Valvoline colors in 1997 at Pocono

Valvoline has sponsored in some sort of capacity in NASCAR since 1981. They first entered the sport with Cale Yarborough in 1981 and 1982 with M. C. Anderson Racing. In 1983 and 1984, they appeared on the Wood Brothers Racing legendary 21 car with Buddy Baker then the year after they sponsored Ron Bouchard and the 47 Race Hill Farms Team. The brand followed Bouchard to Curb Racing in 1986 and then ran with Greg Sacks in 1987 in the 50 for the Dingman Brothers Racing team. The following season, they sponsored RahMoc Enterprises and Neil Bonnett, which capped the season off with a win in Australia, NASCAR's first entry outside of North America.

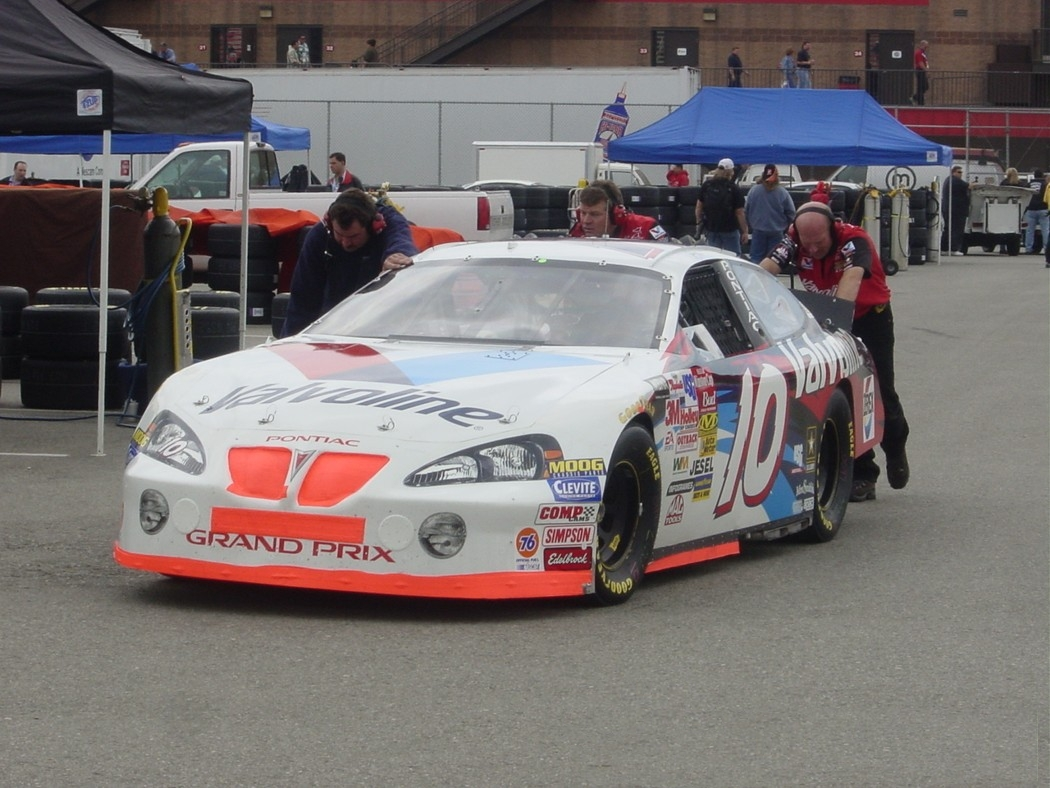
The No. 10 at the 2003 Auto Club 500

In 1992, they started a relationship with Roush Racing and driver Mark Martin which resulted in 27 wins together, one of the winningest combinations in NASCAR history. After the year 2000, Valvoline executive James Rocco decided he wanted to get into the car ownership side of the sport and Valvoline would own and sponsor a team, an unprecedented move at the time. They bought a share of the #10 team that MB2 Motorsports had acquired from Tyler Jet Motorsports during the 2000 season, ran the team as MBV Motorsports (the V standing for Valvoline, and began sponsoring the team in 2001 with Johnny Benson as driver. After winning once in three seasons, Benson was replaced with Scott Riggs. After the 2005 season, Valvoline elected to end its arrangement with MB2 and bought a stake in Evernham Motorsports, taking its sponsorship, car number, and driver to the team. Riggs finished 20th in the series points standings in 2006, but struggled mightily in 2007 and was released prior to the end of the season.

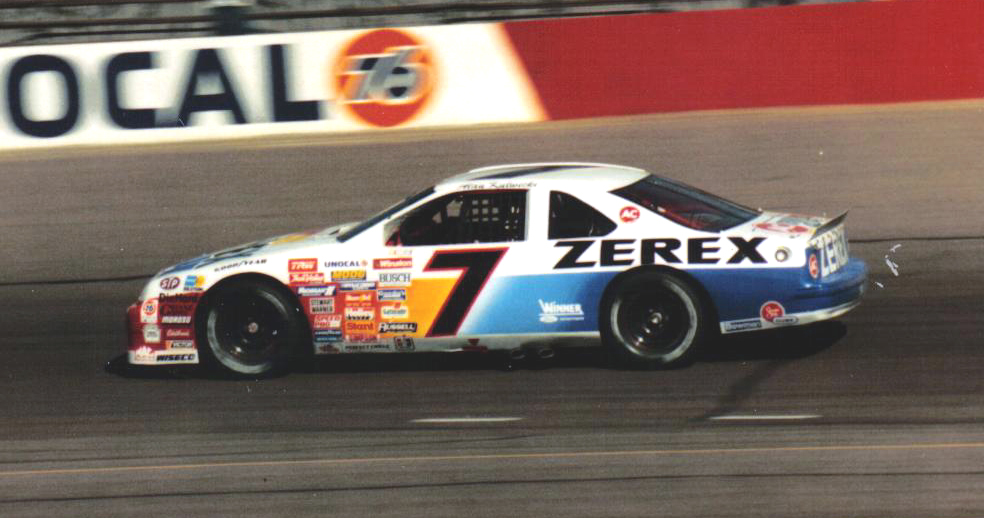
1989 car at Phoenix

In 2007, the team signed Canadian Patrick Carpentier to drive the car. After 2008, Valvoline scaled back its sponsorship to a part time role in 2009 when that team merged with Petty Enterprises and formed Richard Petty Motorsports, they sponsored both Reed Sorenson and A. J. Allmendinger that year on the 43 and 44 Dodge Chargers. Following the season, the sponsorship returned to Roush Fenway Racing to sponsor Matt Kenseth and Greg Biffle in some capacity over the years while also sponsoring Allmendinger's 43 Ford at Richard Petty Motorsports. In 2014, the oil brand reunited with Hendrick Motorsports and continues to this day, they currently sponsor Kyle Larson and William Byron.

In addition to its main brand, Valvoline sponsored Alan Kulwicki and AK Racing from 1987 to 1990 with its Zerex brand of coolants and Rusty Wallace and Blue Max Racing with its Alugard brand of coolants.

=== Other motorsports ===
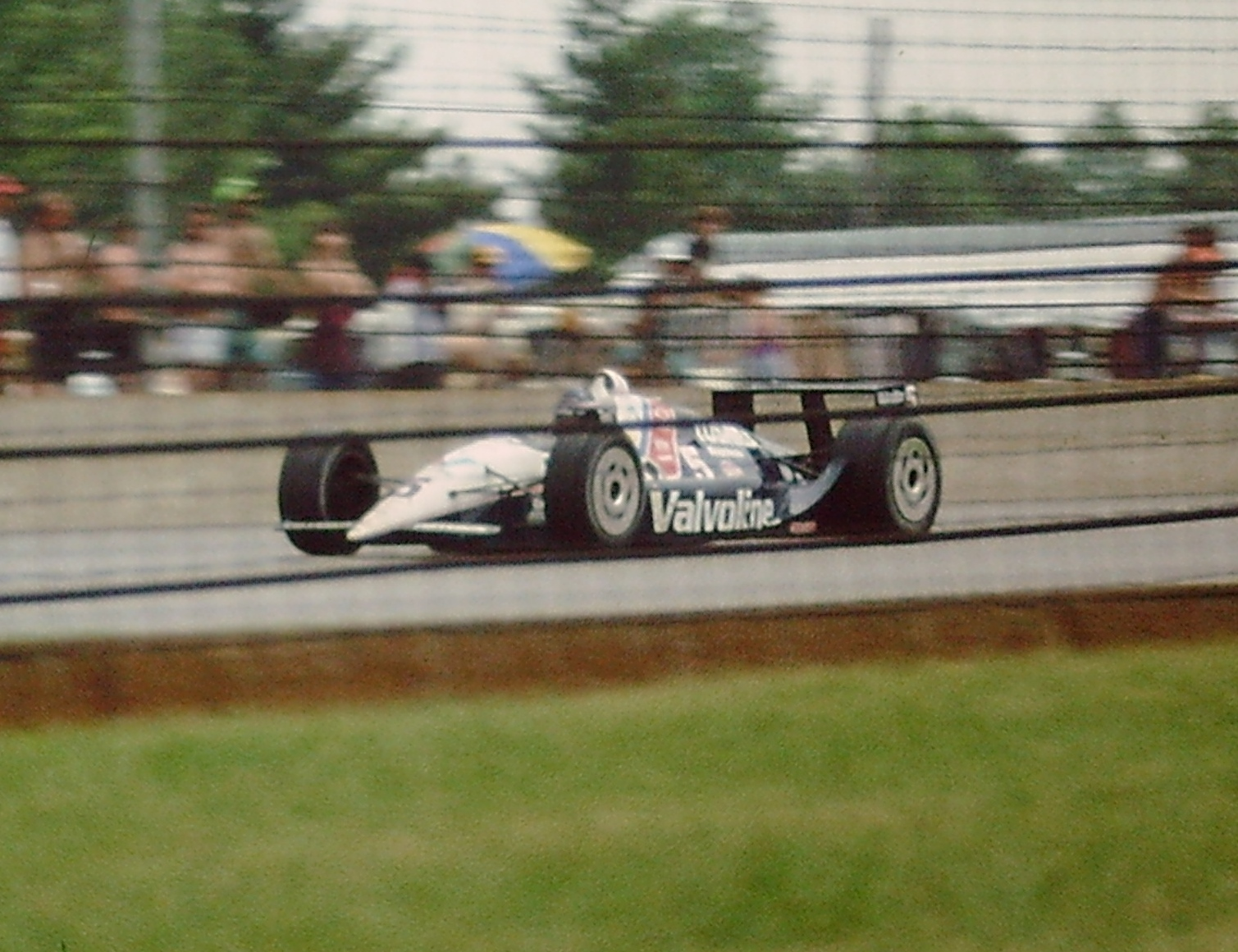
Al Unser Jr. running the 1990 Indianapolis 500

Valvoline sponsored a number of auto races to market its motor oil, including the SCCA National Championship Runoffs and Bommarito Automotive Group 500. Valvoline also sponsored the first woman to compete in both the Daytona 500 and Indianapolis 500, Janet Guthrie, as well as CART driver Al Unser Jr. (1988–1993).

In Australia, Valvoline owns naming rights to the Sydney Speedway and sponsors the Australian Sprintcar Grand Prix. It also sponsored the 1994 Australian Manufacturers' Championship.

Since June 2020, Valvoline sponsors La Liga association club Sevilla FC as a global partner, with their logo appearing on the sleeves of match kits.

Since July 2023 Valvoline is currently sponsoring the Aston Martin Formula One team as an extension of the team's existing partnership with Aramco, and the partnership will be upgraded to lubricant supply role from 2026 season onwards due to Honda engine direct partnership. From the 2025–26 season onwards, Valvoline will also be supplying lubricants to Mahindra-backed Mahindra Formula E Team.
