= Tire Discounters =

American tire dealer and auto repair chain

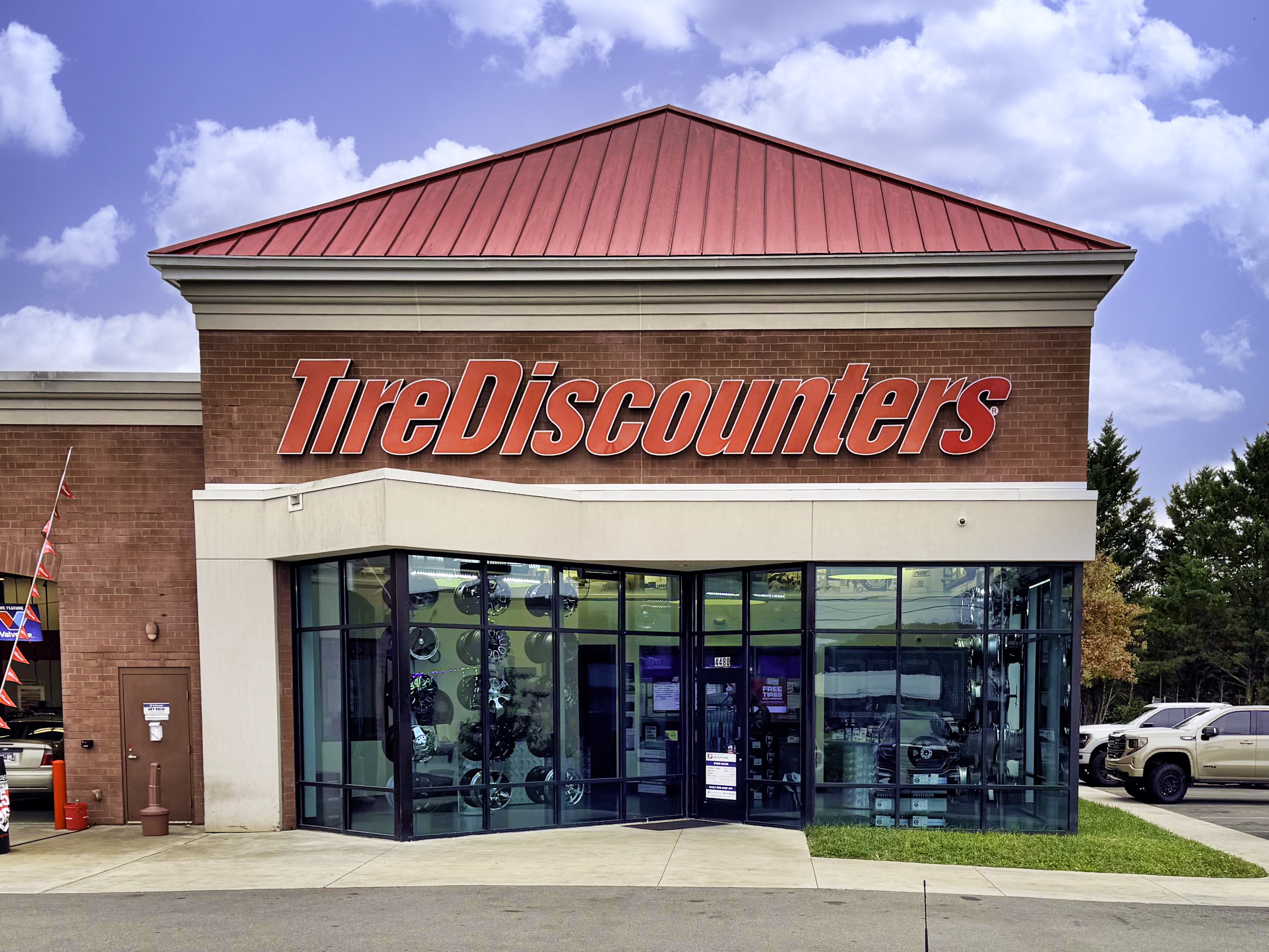
- Type: Privately Held
- Industry: Tires
- Founded: Cincinnati, Ohio, United States (1976; 50 years ago)
- Founder: Chip Wood
- Headquarters: 200 W. 4th St., Cincinnati, OH, United States
- Area served: Ohio, Kentucky, Indiana, Tennessee, Alabama, and Georgia
- Key people: Jamie Ward (President
- Products: Tires, Auto Service, Oil change, Brakes, Shocks and Struts, Wheel alignments, Fluid Exchanges, Auto Glass, ADAS Recalibration and more
- Number of employees: 2000+
- Website: tirediscounters.com

Tire Discounters (Stylized as TireDiscounters) is a tire and auto service shop started by Chip Wood in 1976 in Cincinnati, Ohio. Today, it ranks as the eighth-largest independent tire dealer in the U.S. by Modern Tire Dealer National Rankings 2020.

== History ==
Tire Discounters is Ohio-based, headquartered in Cincinnati. The company is owned and operated by the Wood family. In 2008, it entered the Lexington market. In 2011, it opened a new headquarters in Sharonville, with a 200,000-square-foot warehouse. In the same year, it entered the Louisville market, and in 2014, Nashville. In 2015, the headquarters were moved to downtown Cincinnati, while maintaining warehouses in Sharonville and LaVergne, Tennessee. In 2016, the company opened its 100th store and entered the Chattanooga market. As of November 2023, over 190 stores are located across Ohio, Kentucky, Indiana, Tennessee, Virginia, North Carolina and Georgia, and employ more than 2,000 people. In most markets, Tire Discounters overlaps with the rival Discount Tire chain; the two are not related despite the similar names.

== Tire Discounters signs ==
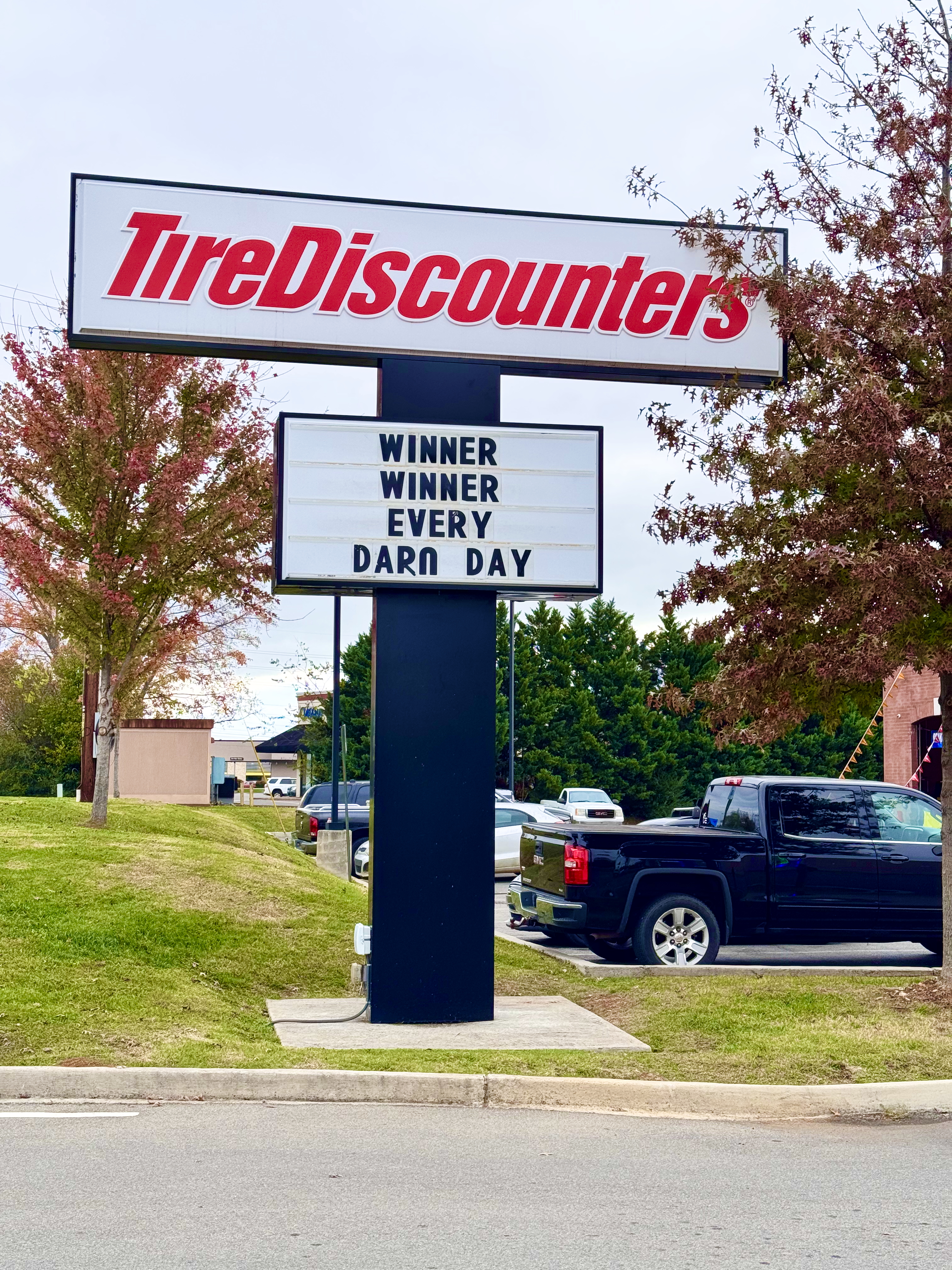
Typical quirky copy on a Tire Discounters sign

Chip Wood wrote the original signs for years. Now, sign lettering is coordinated at the Cincinnati office and distributed to stores. They have been shared on BuzzFeed, Reddit, and more.

== Tallest tire stack ==
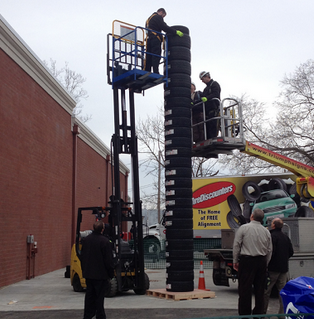
Record-breaking 2014 tire stack

In celebration of the reopening of its first store, Tire Discounters built a stack of Falken Tires on March 27, 2014, that was 19.95 ft tall. The previous tire stacking world record of 19.77 was set on September 6, 2009, in Wiesental, Germany.

== Wounded Warrior Project ==
Tire Discounters supports Wounded Warrior Project; during a week-long event, Tire Discounters Inc. locations in three states did not charge customers labor on tires or oil changes, and instead collected donations for the Wounded Warrior Project. The first-time event raised more than $20,631. Customers donated $9,140 that week, and Tire Discounters added a $1 donation for every social-media share, phone call, and appointment booked during the event. As of November 2023, Tire Discounters has raised over $600,000 for the Wounded Warrior Project.
