= McQuay-Norris =

McQuay-Norris was a maker of automobile engine parts such as piston rings, and chassis parts like steering wheel knuckle bolts. It also produced and distributed electrical controls for gas appliances. Based in St. Louis, Missouri, the company merged with Eaton Yale & Towne Inc., Cleveland, Ohio, in August 1969. Prior to the merger, the McCord Corporation, of Detroit, Michigan, acquired 10.5% of McQuay-Norris common stock, in June 1969.

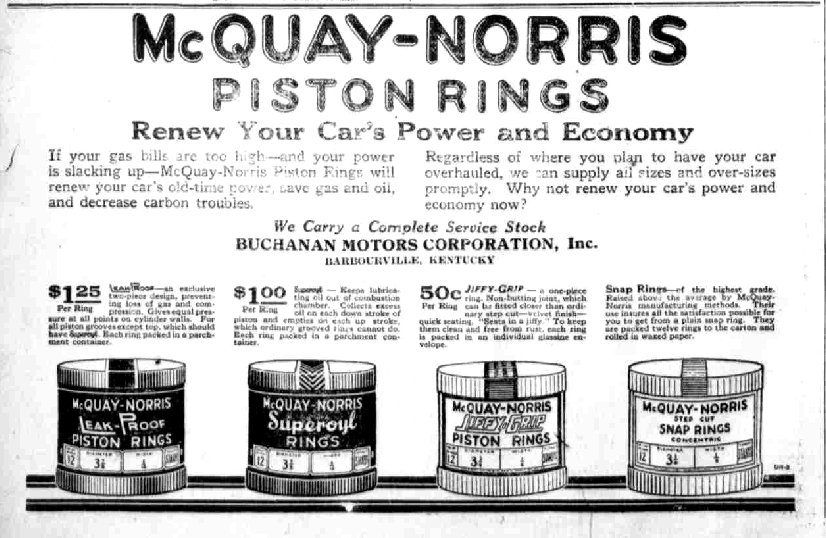
Newspaper ad for McQuay-Norris piston rings, 1922.

According to interviews with at least one St. Louis resident, McQuay-Norris manufactured bullets in the 1940s.

== Test vehicle ==
In January 1936 McQuay-Norris produced a fleet of six cars called aluminum eggs for their strange appearance. The cars were released in New York and in other locations in the United States. Each auto was a part of testing of pistons, piston rings, and other engine parts manufactured by McQuay Norris. The bodies of the aluminum eggs were mounted on standard chassis of cars of different brands. They were driven in the United States, Canada, and Mexico, in different climates and highway conditions.

The aluminum eggs featured a streamlined design which reduced air resistance. Streamlining was effective in enabling the installation of fifteen instruments used in testing. These included a blow-by meter, which measured the gas which escaped to the auto's crankcase, having passed by the pistons and piston rings. Another instrument employed was an exhaust gas analyzer. This gauge measured the combustion efficiency of the engine. A viscometer was used to test the body thickness of crankcase oil.

== Company miscellaneous ==
- McQuay-Norris rented 13,000 square feet (1,200 m^{2}) of space in a building at 239 - 249 West 66th Street (Manhattan), in December 1936.
- In 1968 McQuay-Norris reported income of $1.12 million on net sales of $32.5 million.
- By mid 1969 McQuay-Norris was a supplier of replacement auto parts.
- By 2009 McQuay-Norris was part of the Affinia Group of auto part companies. Affinia also owns the Aimco, AquaChek, Nakata, Quinton Hazell, Raybestos, WIX and BrakePro brands of aftermarket automotive parts.
