= Winston Tire Company =

Defunct tire and automotive service chain

- Company type: Private company
- Industry: Automotive and Manufacturing
- Founded: 1962
- Founder: Sam Winston and Ray Oliver
- Defunct: 2002
- Fate: Acquired by Goodyear Tire and Rubber Company. Some locations were converted into Just Tires stores, others were sold to independent dealers and third party owners.
- Headquarters: Burbank, California, United States

The Winston Tire Company was an American tire manufacturer and automotive service chain based in Burbank, California., and was founded by Sam Winston and Ray Oliver. The company was in business from 1962 to 2002 when it was acquired by the Goodyear Tire and Rubber Company.

== History ==
Sam Winston began selling tires as a teenager after his father's death when his mother married Ray Oliver. Oliver teamed up with Sam to sell tires wholesale in 1962. Two years later, the two men opened their first retail store in Glendale as a Delta Tires dealer. Sam would earn a Bachelor's degree in Economics at the University of Southern California in 1964.

The company's early growth got off to a slow start, with only four more additional stores opened in its first four years, However, the next two decades saw rapid expansion and further growth. In 1971, Sam would introduce his own private-label tire line, Winston, and in 1976, he began adding services such as brake and wheel alignment repairs.

=== Sam's involvement in commercials ===
For many years, beginning in the 1980s, Winston began starring as a pitchman in a series of television and radio commercials for the company. Jean Craig, a principal of Kresser Craig Inc., which was Winston Tire's advertising agency beginning in 1982, said that Winston didn't particularly like being the spokesman for Winston Tire, but he did it because of his reputation as a recognized personality in the business who attracted enormous attention to consumers and kept their awareness high. Winston's competitors claimed that the ads have been a factor in the growth of Winston Tire.

=== Lawsuit, financial problems, and Sam's death ===
Winston Tire's reputation was hit hard by a 1993 state investigation, which found that some of Winston's stores made unnecessary car repairs. The company's sales were hurt after being investigated by undercover agents from the Department of Consumer Affairs who took the cars in top condition to various Winston stores and said they were overcharged over $125 for unnecessary sales of parts and service. In 1993, Winston Tire agreed to pay $1.4 million to settle the case out of court, which included reimbursing $450,000 to 20,000 customers. Despite the settlement, the company did not admit any wrongdoing, and as a result, the company set up various consumer protection programs as a safeguard.

In its 1994 fiscal year, Winston Tire posted a loss of $647,000 on $134.9 million in sales, compared to a $1.2-million loss on $147.7 million in sales in 1993, according to Dun & Bradstreet. Despite all this, Winston Tire remained a profitable company, according to Tom Bonburg, who at the time was Winston Tire's chief executive.

The company however, suffered a major blow on September 26, 1995, when Sam was killed in an automobile accident in Utah after being ejected from a 1995 Jeep Wrangler that went out of control with his wife Demetra at the wheel. At the time of his death, the company had 172 stores throughout California and Arizona.

=== Ownership changes, bankruptcy, and acquisition by Goodyear ===
In May 1997, Winston Tire was acquired by the Heafner Tire Company (now American Tire Distributors). Four years later, on May 15, 2001, Heafner sold the chain to Performance Management, Inc. of Lafayette, Louisiana.

On January 19, 2002, Winston Tire filed for Chapter 11 bankruptcy protection.

On October 28, 2002, Goodyear Tire and Rubber Company, the longtime supplier to the Winston Tire chain, acquired the company's assets and converted 44 of the chain's 97 locations into Just Tires outlets and sold the rest to existing independent Goodyear dealers and other third parties. The deal eventually put an end to the company after 40 years in business.
