= KOI Auto Parts =

- Company type: Private
- Industry: Retail
- Founded: 1946
- Headquarters: Cincinnati, Ohio, United States
- Number of locations: 60 (November 2020)
- Products: Auto Parts
- Website: www.koiautoparts.com

KOI Auto Parts is an American chain of auto parts stores founded in 1946 in Newport, Kentucky. Today KOI Auto Parts operates 60 stores located throughout the US states Ohio, Kentucky, and Indiana. The corporate office of KOI Auto Parts is located in Newport, Kentucky. KOI Auto Parts is a supplier of OE and aftermarket import and domestic replacement automotive parts and accessories, automotive refinish supplies, equipment, tools and various other parts and services.

== History ==
KOI Auto Parts originally started as Nelter Oil Company, a gas and service station, by the Neltner family, father William and sons Tony and Wilfred. In 1953 they purchased a local auto parts retailer named Kentucky Motor Service. They continued to grow, acquiring additional local auto parts retailers Wilcox Auto Parts & Savage Auto Parts, eventually changing the name of the company to KOI Auto Parts incorporating the three predominant states it did business in, K-Kentucky, O-Ohio, I-Indiana.

In 1987 KOI Auto Parts became a member of the Federated Auto Parts group. KOI Auto Parts became an ESOP, (Employee Owned) company in 1999.

In 2014 KOI Auto Parts merged with Fisher Auto Parts.

== Recognitions ==
KOI Auto Parts is the 11th largest auto parts chain in the United States as of 2013. It was also named 2011 Automotive Aftermarket Industry Association Head of Class Award recipient and "Federated Auto Parts Outstanding Marketing Member" of the Year in 2011.

== Sponsorships ==
KOI Auto Parts was the official auto parts store and sponsor of the Cincinnati Reds from 2009 through 2015. KOI also sponsors several other events and car shows including the annual Cavalcade of Customs car show held every year in Cincinnati which was featured on the MAVTV show Two Guys Garage in 2012, the Lawrenceburg Speedway, and the Pumpkin Run Nationals car show.

== Merger ==
KOI Auto Parts announced, effective April 1, 2014, that Fisher Auto Parts will acquire controlling interest in the company. Fisher Auto Parts now has 470 locations, plus more than 100 independent jobbers in 18 states.
