= Fountain Tire =

Canadian tire dealer and automotive service provider

Fountain Tire Holdings Ltd.
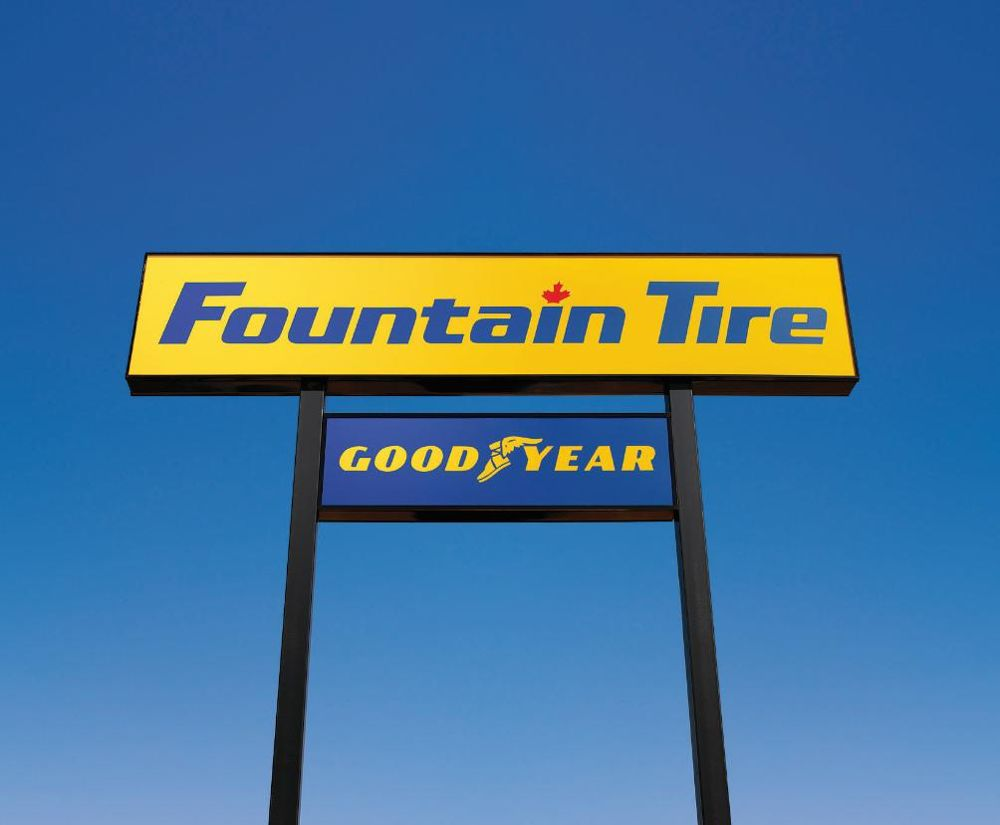
- Type: Private
- Industry: Automotive Retail Distribution
- Founded: 1956; 70 years ago, Wainwright, Alberta, Canada
- Headquarters: Edmonton, Alberta, Canada
- Number of locations: 164 locations (As of July 26, 2023)
- Key people: Jason G. Herle (CEO)
- Products: Tires and automotive parts, sales, and service
- Website: www.fountaintire.com

Fountain Tire Holdings Ltd. is a Canadian tire dealer and automotive service provider with 164 consumer locations and eight distribution centres in Central and Western Canada. The company also provides tires and tire-related services for commercial fleets and off-road vehicles in the agricultural, oil and gas, mining, and construction sectors.

Fountain Tire operates under a 50/50 partnership model, where some store managers own equity stakes in their respective locations.

== History ==
Fountain Tire was founded in 1956 by Bill Fountain. The company started as a small, double-bay garage in Wainwright, Alberta, and offered in-the-field service to farmers. As it grew, Bill Fountain decided to offer local managers 50 percent equity in their stores, a practice still in use today.

In 1976, Bill Fountain was killed in a car accident, leaving behind a network of 19 stores and partners.

In the 1980s, the company moved its head office to Edmonton and adjusted its expansion strategy. On September 24, 1987, Fountain Tire sold 49 percent of its business to Goodyear Canada. By the end of the 1990s, 100 new Fountain Tire stores had been added across Western Canada.

In 2014, Fountain Tire relocated its corporate headquarters to Fountain Tire Place in South Edmonton.

In 2016, Fountain Tire reached its 60th anniversary. To mark its 60th anniversary, the company ran a drive-in movie tour marketing campaign.

As of 2023, Fountain Tire operates 164 locations across Canada.

The company has contributed to charitable organizations, including the United Way and Junior Achievement. In 2019, CEO Brent Hesje received a Northern Lights Award of Distinction from the Edmonton Chamber of Commerce.

== Headquarter ==
Fountain Tire's corporate office is located in South Edmonton at Fountain Tire Place.

== Marketing ==
Fountain Tire's slogans have included "Home of the Tire Experts," "Winning the West," "Your Alberta Tire Store" and "Trust. Fountain Tire."

Actor and comedian Thom Sharp became Fountain Tire's spokesperson in 1994 and was known as "The Fountain Tire Guy" for more than 20 years.

In 2018, Fountain Tire introduced the tagline "We're on this road together."

== Awards ==
Fountain Tire has been recognized by Deloitte as one of Canada's Best Managed Companies since 1994.

Fountain Tire's "Fan Bods" campaign won three Gold and two Silver awards at the 2019 Clio Sports awards and a Silver Digital – Apps/Mobile and Merit, PR – Community Building at the 2019 Marketing awards.
