= Valtus (company) =

Interim management firm

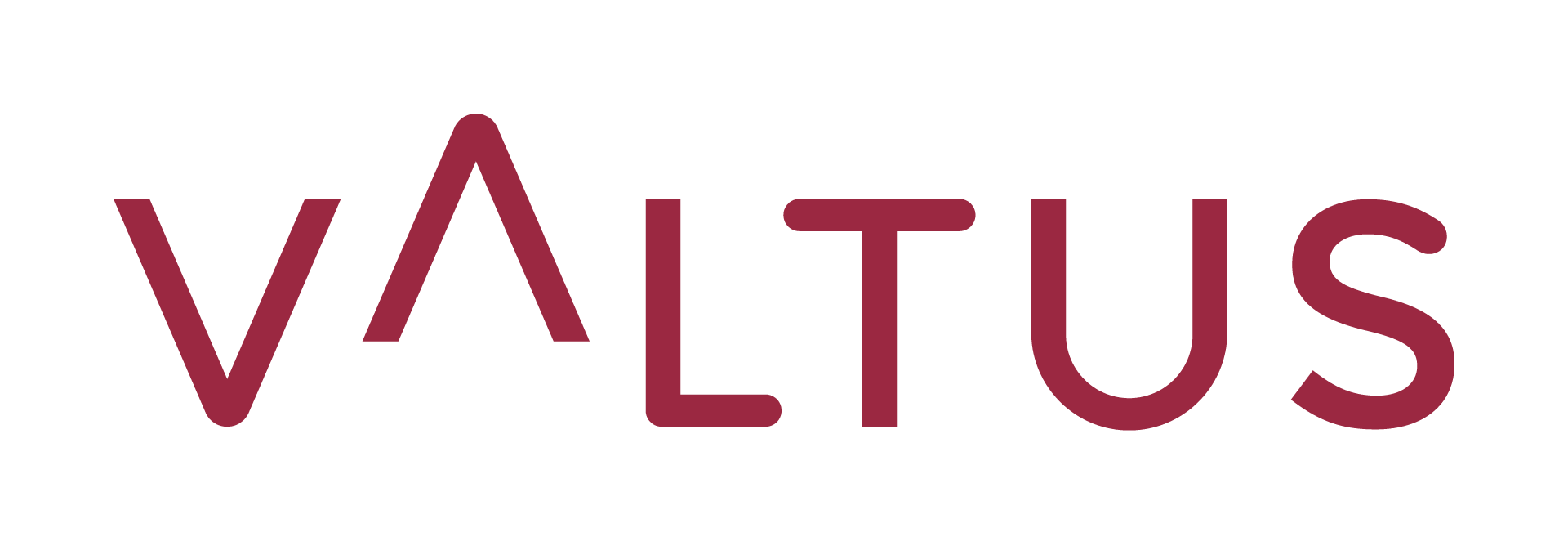
- Type: Private
- Industry: Executive interim management
- Founded: 2001
- Founder: Philippe Soullier
- Headquarters: Paris, France
- Area served: Worldwide (via Valtus Alliance)
- Revenue: 145.5 million € (2025)
- Subsidiaries: Valtus UK, Nordic Interim (Sweden, Finland, Denmark), Management Factory (Austria), FS Partners (Switzerland), Valtus Germany, Valtus Italy, Easy Talent (France)
- Website: valtusgroup.com

Valtus is an executive interim management firm. The company operates in nearly 30 countries and has 10 integrated subsidiaries.

== History ==
Valtus was founded by Philippe Soullier in Paris, France, in 2001. In 2010, the company was certified for the quality of its services by Bureau Veritas. In 2012, Décideurs Magazine ranked the firm first among interim management organizations and rated its restructuring work as "Excellent". In 2013, Le Magazine des Affaires also ranked Valtus first in restructuring by interim managers. For the 2016-2017 fiscal year, the company's turnover was 36 million euros. While international activities accounted for 20% of all assignments at that time, the company opened its capital by allowing the investment fund Initiative & Finance to take a 27% stake.

Valtus entered the United Kingdom in 2018. In 2019, the investment funds Société Générale Capital Partenaires and GENEO Capital Entrepreneur bought out the equity stakes previously held by Initiative & Finance. In 2020, new subsidiaries were opened in Sweden and Finland, followed by Denmark in 2021, and Austria in 2022. In 2023, the group launched Valtus Alliance, an international network of executive interim management providers. During 2024, the company expanded into Germany, Italy, and Saudi Arabia. A Swiss subsidiary, FS Partners, was added in 2025.

In February 2026, Valtus received a majority private equity investment from Polaris Private Equity, with reinvestment from founder Philippe Soullier, the company’s management team, and existing minority shareholders GENEO Capital Entrepreneur and Société Générale Capital Partenaires. The size of the investment was not publicly disclosed.

== Services ==
Valtus provides executive interim management services to organizations undergoing structural or operational changes. The firm’s primary activity involves the placement of external executives into senior leadership roles, including positions within Executive Committees and Management Committees.

The company's service offerings are categorized into several operational areas:

- Executive interim management services – temporary placement of experienced executives (e.g., CEO, CFO, COO, HR, CIO) to lead organisations through change or critical situations.
- Program, project, and consulting services – provision of senior program and project leaders and former management consultants to manage strategic initiatives, transformations, and complex projects.
- Restructuring and financial advisory – support from seasoned CFOs and financial specialists for profitability improvement, cash optimisation, debt restructuring, and crisis turnaround.
- Functional specialist services – on-demand middle managers and specialists in areas such as finance, HR, procurement, supply chain, legal, accounting and logistics via the subsidiary Easy Talent.

The firm utilizes a network of managers who typically have a minimum of 15 years of experience in senior leadership roles. The service delivery model is structured around a reported response time of 24 to 72 hours from the initial client request to the proposal of a candidate. Each assignment is overseen by a partner from the firm who serves as a liaison between the client organization and the interim manager for the duration of the project.
