= Nipparts =

- Type: Private
- Industry: Automotive
- Genre: Automotive car parts
- Founded: 1981
- Headquarters: Amsterdam
- Area served: Europe
- Key people: R. Bel
- Products: Automotive goods and services
- Owner: LKQ Corporation
- Number of employees: 6
- Parent: Sator Holding
- Website: Nipparts B.V.

Nipparts is a private company set up in 1981 and based in the Netherlands and supplies Japanese and Korean aftermarket car parts in Europe. Nipparts is next to Blue Print and Herth & Buss the market leading brand for Asian vehicle applications.

== History ==
Nipparts was established in 1981. From 2005, Nipparts has been a member of Sator Holding.

Nipparts is an automotive parts seller, that specialises in Japanese and Korean parts. It is based in the Netherlands but is also present in over 35 countries. As specialists in Japanese and Korean parts, Nipparts supplies parts for over 35 car manufactures such as Nissan, Toyota and Kia. Parts include air filters, clutches and fan belts.

=== Origins of Name ===
The Nipparts name derives from the word Nippon, a native name for Japan.

== Divisions ==
Nipparts is active in the entire European market. In the Benelux Nipparts is sold in through Van Heck.

=== Nipparts B.V. ===
It is based in Amsterdam. The warehouse, originally based in Amsterdam, was moved to Turin in 2018.
