= American Tire Distributors =

American distributor and retailer of automotive parts

- Formerly: J.H. Heafner Co. Heafner Tire
- Founded: 1935; 91 years ago
- Founder: J.H. Heafner
- Headquarters: Huntersville, North Carolina
- Area served: United States and Canada
- Key people: Ira Silver (President and CEO)
- Revenue: US$5B (2015)
- Number of employees: 5,000 (2024)
- Website: https://www.atd.com/

American Tire Distributors (ATD) is a wholesale distributor and retailer of automobile tires based in Huntersville, North Carolina, United States. Founded in 1935, it is one of the largest independent suppliers of replacement tires in the country, with more than 115 distribution centers and approximately 4,500 associates serving approximately 80,000 customers.

== History ==
J.H. Heafner Co. was founded in Lincolnton, North Carolina, in 1935. The company acquired Winston Tire Company in 1997, and moved ATD's headquarters from Lincolnton to Charlotte in 1998. Heafner Tire sold Winston Tire Company to Performance Management, Inc. in 2001.

In 2000, Heafner Group acquired American Tire Distributors. Heafner Tire changed its name to American Tire Distributors (ATD) in 2002. American Tire Distributors was acquired by TPG Capital in 2010.

ATD filed for Chapter 11 bankruptcy protection in October 2018, seeking to cut $1.1 billion of the company's debt. ATD received assistance refinancing from investors, including Wells Fargo. The company emerged from bankruptcy in December 2018.

The company struggled to recover in the wake of filing bankruptcy due to the loss of its relationship with several major tire manufacturers. American Tire Distributors had an annual revenue of $5 billion in 2019. In February 2021, Goldman Sachs led talks on a $1 billion junk bond deal to refinance ATD, which had not recovered from the loss of major manufacturing partners.

As of 2021, Forbes lists the company as the 81st largest privately owned company in the United States. In 2022, American Tire Distributors sold their Canadian operations (National Tire Distributors) to Groupe Touchette.

In October 2024, ATD filed for Chapter 11 bankruptcy protection for the second time, listing assets and liabilities between $1 billion and $10 billion. The company plans to sell itself to new owners in efforts to eliminate debt.

In March 2025, American Tire Distributors (ATD) completed a major sale of most of its assets. Despite the ownership change, it retained its established brand name. Ira Silver assumed the roles of president and chief executive officer.

On May 5, 2025, it was announced that an entity formed by a group of ATD creditors had acquired substantially all of the firm's assets.

== Awards ==
In 2024, ATD has been recognized as the recipient of an Environment+Energy Leader Award and a Stevie Award for Sales & Customer Service.

Furthermore, the firm has received multiple awards at The American Business Awards, including a Gold Stevie Award in the Company of the Year - Automotive & Transport Equipment – Large category and a Silver Stevie Award in the Artificial Intelligence/Machine Learning Solution category.
