= Valvoline Instant Oil Change =

American automotive services company

- Formerly: Valvoline Rapid Oil Change
- Company type: Wholly owned subsidiary
- Industry: Automotive services
- Founded: 1985; 41 years ago
- Headquarters: Lexington, Kentucky, United States
- Number of locations: 1,252 (2019)
- Parent: Valvoline
- Website: vioc.com

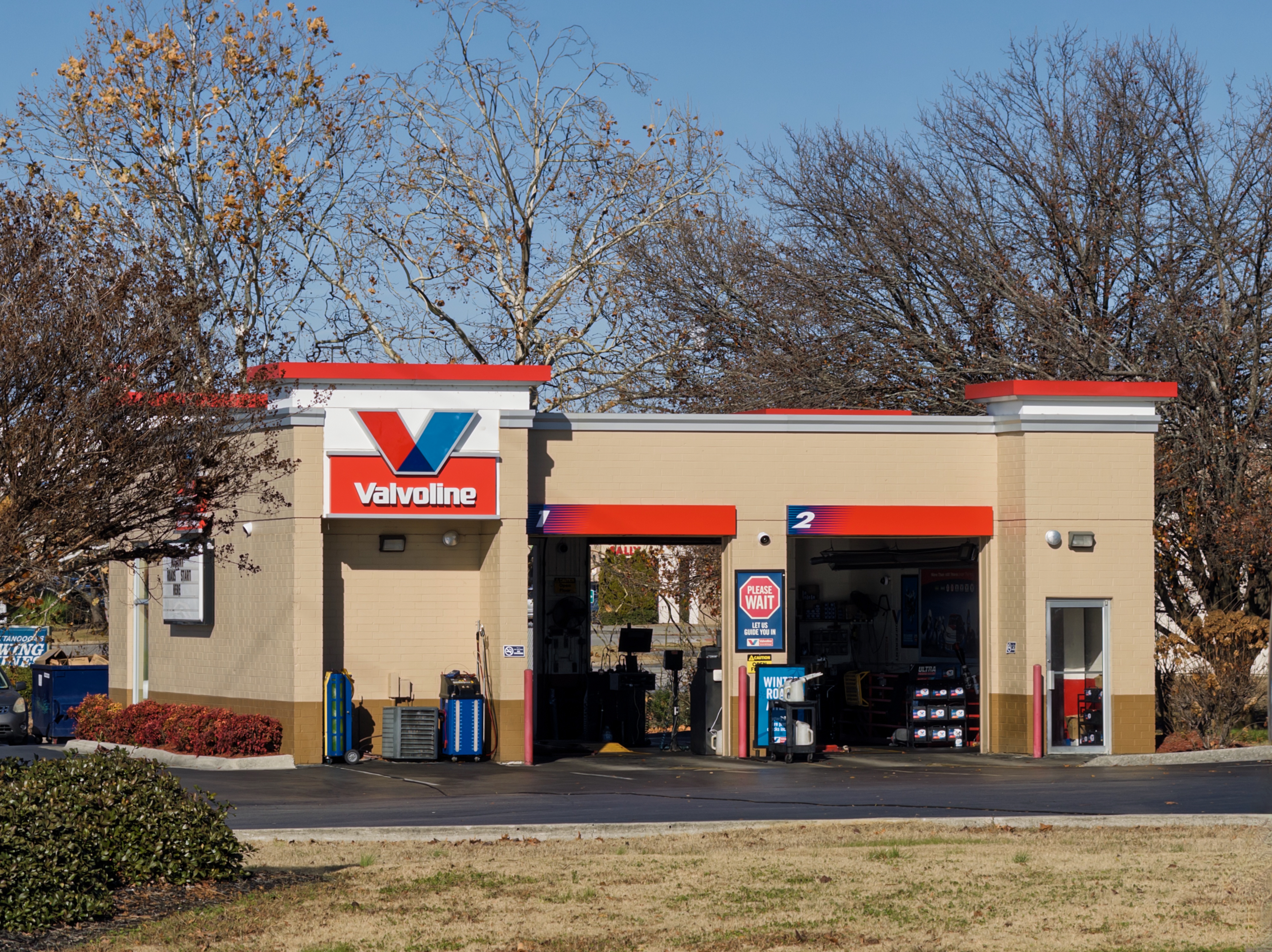
A Valvoline Instant Oil Change outlet in Chattanooga, Tennessee

Valvoline Instant Oil Change is a company that provides preventive maintenance services for many different types of automobiles. These services include oil changes, antifreeze changes, differential fluid changes, batteries, belts, fuel system cleaning service, lights, wipers and transmission fluid changes, and in states where services are contracted out by state regulatory agencies, emissions testing. Valvoline oils and products are featured at all locations.
