= VIP Tires and Service =

US automotive aftermarket company

- Industry: Automotive aftermarket company
- Founded: 1958; 68 years ago
- Headquarters: Auburn, Maine
- Key people: John P. Quirk (Executive Chairman); Tim Winkeler (President and CEO)
- Parent: Quirk Tires and Service
- Website: www.vipauto.com

VIP Tires and Service, previously known as VIP Parts, Tires and Service, is an automotive service provider and tire dealer headquartered in Auburn, Maine. Staffing its stores with certified automotive professionals, VIP offers auto repair and maintenance, among other services.

As of 2026, VIP has nearly 80 stores throughout New England, including Maine, New Hampshire, Massachusetts, Vermont, and Connecticut. It is northern New England's largest privately held auto service provider and tire dealer, employing over 800 workers.

== History ==
Founded in 1958 by Thomas O. Auger of Lewiston, Maine, VIP Tires and Service is based in Auburn, Maine. In 2001, VIP was purchased by Quirk Tires and Service. Quirk Tires was founded by Edward S. Quirk in 1926 in Watertown, Massachusetts, and is one of the oldest tire dealers in the United States. VIP was headed by John P. Quirk, Edward's grandson, who served as president and CEO of the company. In 2018, Quirk was named "Independent Tire Dealer of the Year" by Modern Tire Dealer. As of 2026, he is VIP's executive chairman.

From 1981 to 2007, VIP sponsored a one-day event held at the Oxford Plains Speedway in Oxford, Maine. The event was the largest single day car show in northern New England.

In 2008, VIP received the Polk Inventory Efficiency Award in the retailer and distributor category for advanced product control technology. The Polk Inventory Efficiency Award, presented by R.L. Polk & Co., recognizes and rewards outstanding aftermarket companies for process improvements relative to inventory efficiency.

In March 2026, VIP marked its 100th year in business (under the Quirk banner) with contests, videos, and other celebrations.

== Leadership ==
Tim Winkeler has served as president and CEO at VIP since 2018, when Quirk became executive chairman. He oversees all business functions at the company. Winkeler was previously the vice president of merchandising and chief operating officer at VIP.

Gary MacCausland is VIP's COO, while Ray Donlon is general counsel and chief risk officer. In April 2026, Cooper Babcock joined the company as chief administrative officer.

== Services ==
VIP provides a wide range of services related to auto repair and maintenance to its customers, in addition to selling tires. The company also offers emissions inspections.

VIP staffs its locations with Automotive Service Excellence (ASE) including 8 world class technicians and hundreds of ASE technicians along with Tire Industry Association (TIA) certified professionals, and is known for offering education and certification opportunities to employees.

VIP also educates drivers about best practices, such as avoiding potholes and using winter tires in colder climates.

== Philanthropy ==
In 2025, VIP received the "WishMaker Award" from Make-A-Wish Maine for its charitable contributions to the organization. VIP partnered with Make-A-Wish in 2008, and has contributed more than $1.6 million to the charity.
