= Tirecraft =

Tirecraft is a Canadian owned and operated network of tire and mechanical retailers.

Founded in Vernon, B.C. in 1968, the Tirecraft brand was purchased in 1990 by Remington Group, whose Town & Country Tire locations were re-branded to become Tirecraft Auto Centres.

Tirecraft has grown to over 300 independently owned locations across Canada, from Newfoundland to Vancouver Island.

== History ==
The first Tirecraft was opened by brothers Jack and Alf Peters. The original store, named Peters Tirecraft, still operates in Vernon, British Columbia but has since changed its name to Trail Tire Auto Centers. Since its inception, the Tirecraft brand has continually expanded. It has added over 150 locations since the turn of the century, now having over 300 locations. These locations specialize in tires for passenger and light truck vehicles, commercial trucks, off-road vehicles, retreading commercial and off-road tires, selling and servicing rims, auto parts, auto accessories and automotive services.

They are also one of the first tire retailers to offer nationwide commercial road side service in Canada with their Tire Service Network (TSN) program.

== Services ==
Tirecraft sells and services a wide range of name brand products, including Michelin, BFGoodrich, Goodyear, Yokohama, Bridgestone, Hankook, Pirelli, Continental, Firestone, Falken, Mickey Thompson and Toyo.

Select locations offer mechanical services such as brakes, suspension, diagnostics, oil changes, alignments and preventative maintenance.

Some locations also offer a full range and services of commercial and off-road tires.

== Awards ==
In 2007, Tirecraft won the JD Power Associates Highest Overall Customer Service among Service Provider Brands under Canadian Customer Commitment Index.
