= Motrio =

French auto repair shop

MOTRIO
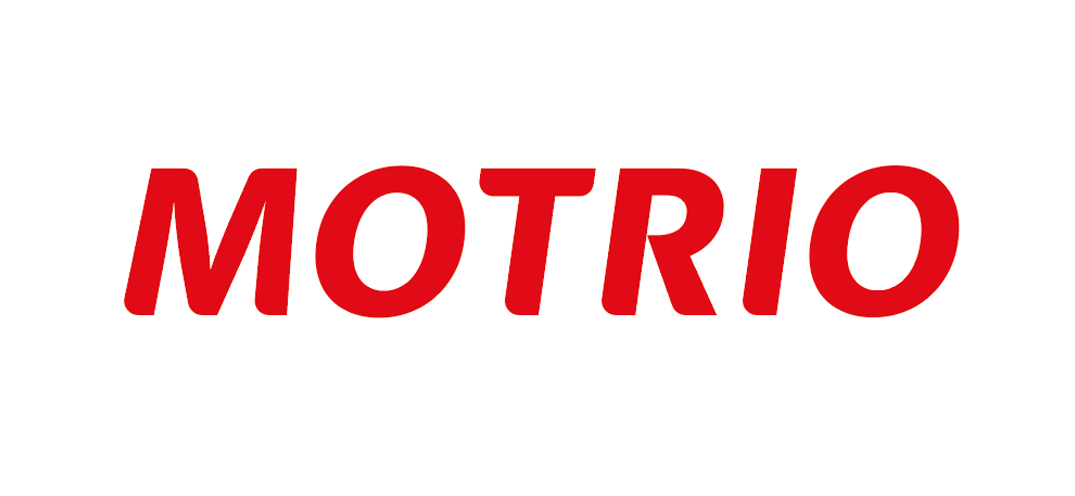
- Current owner: Renault
- Country: France
- Introduced: 1998; 28 years ago
- Related brands: Automotive parts, car maintenance service
- Markets: Worldwide (21 countries)
- Tagline: Your car is our drive
- Website: https://www.motrio.co.uk/

MOTRIO is an automotive parts brand launched by Renault in 1998, covering both Renault/Dacia vehicles and other brands. In 2003, MOTRIO introduced a network of multi-brand repairers.

== Development ==
MOTRIO was created in 1998. The brand started in France and Italy, but later expanded to Germany, Spain, and Portugal by 2000. As of 2021, MOTRIO is present in 21 countries with its own network consisting of 2660 multi-brand workshops spread over 3 continents (Europe, Asia and Africa), and is present in 90 countries with multi-brand product distribution.

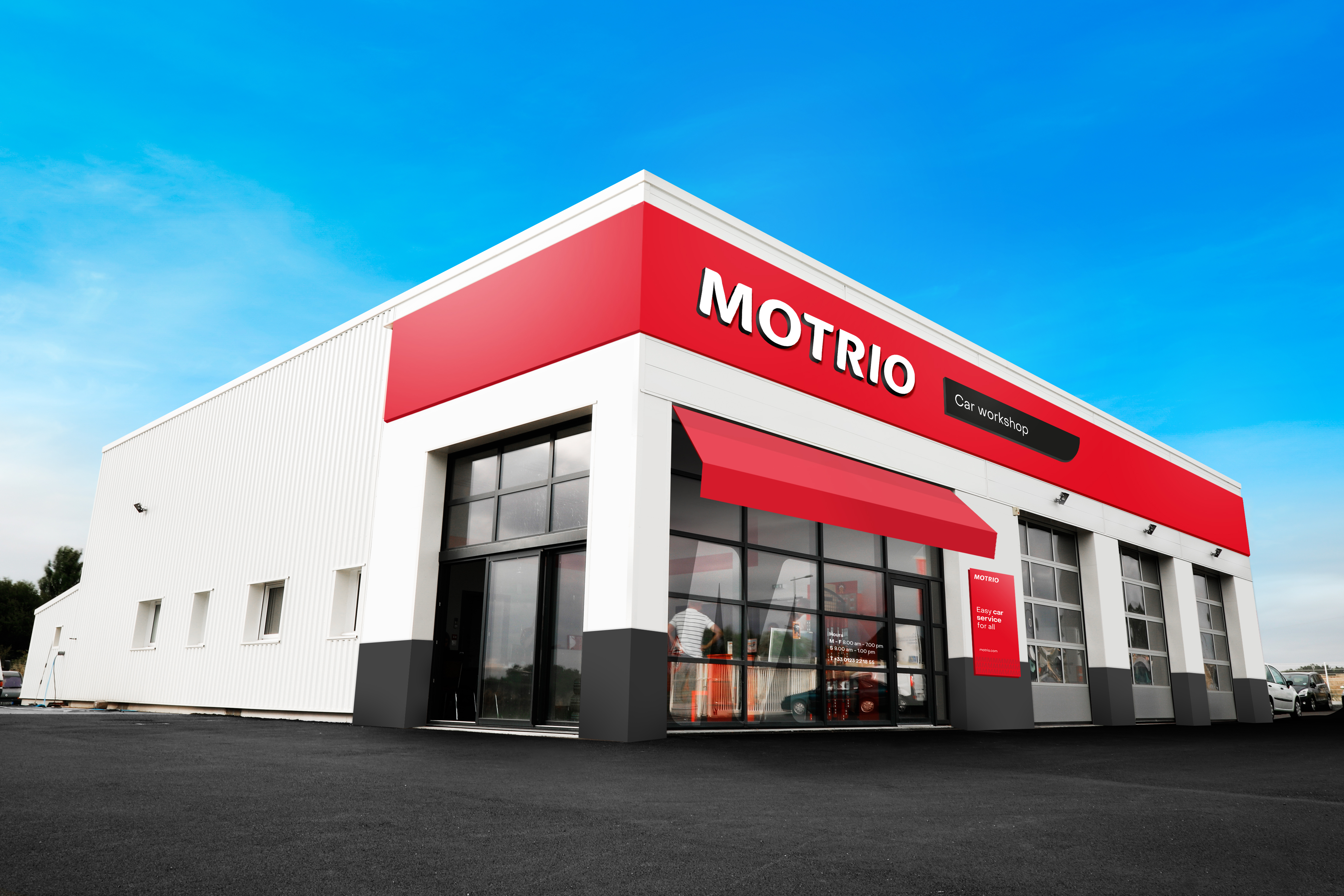
Garage MOTRIO

In 2005, MOTRIO launched their website. Later that year, MOTRIO introduced Motelio, a management software for car dealers. Since January 2010, Renault was one of the first carmakers to introduce its own tires in France, Portugal, Germany, Turkey, Romania, Spain and Belgium. The new product line sold more than a million units in two years.

== Logos ==
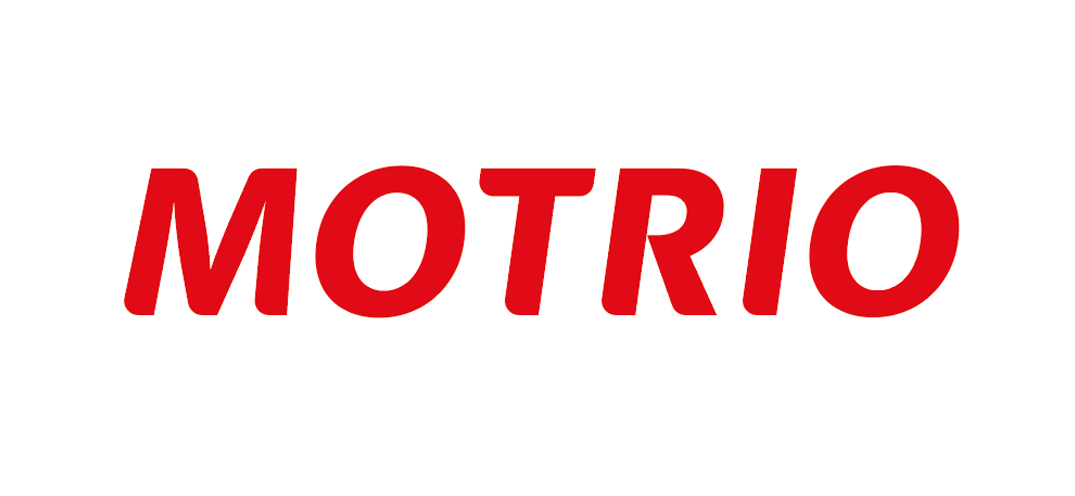
2022 - Current logo

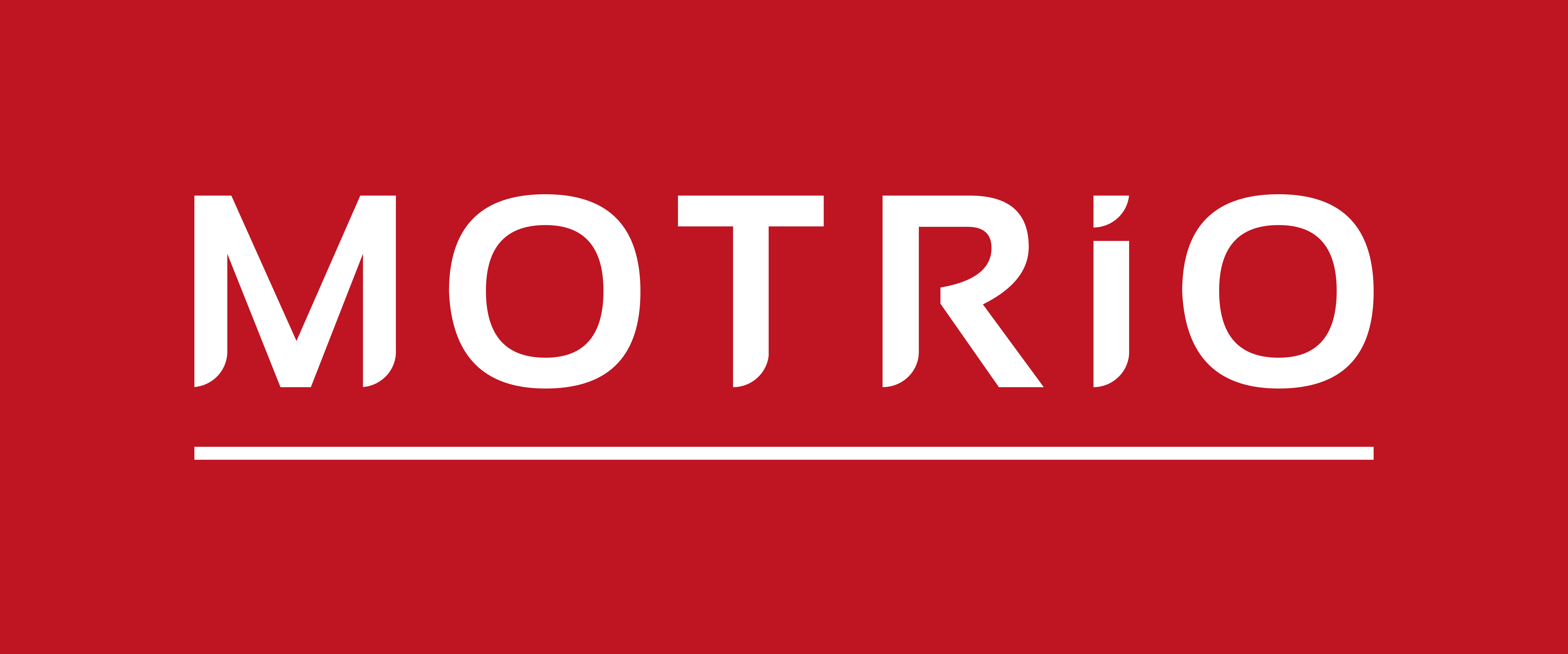
From 2017 to 2022

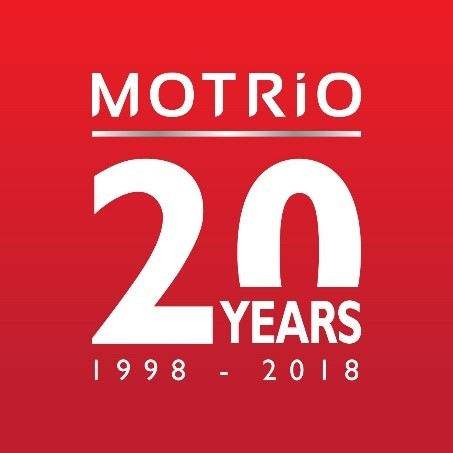
2018 - Commemorative logo

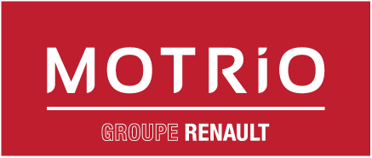
From 2003 to 2017

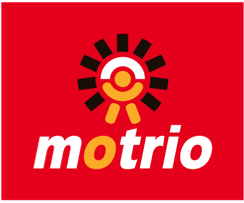
From 1998 to 2003

== MOTRIO for the environment ==
The MOTRIO brand is committed to a programme that aims to achieve zero CO2 emissions. By joining the Treedom project, the brand is able to offset 100% of the carbon dioxide emissions produced by its participation in trade fairs.

== Events and fairs ==
MOTRIO regularly participates in car trade fairs, such as:

- 2025 - Autopromotec Bologna, Italy
- 2025 - Motortec Madrid, Spain
- 2024 - MECHANEX Sandown - UK
- 2024 - EXPOMECANICA Oporto, Portugal
- 2024 - Mechanex Harrogate - UK
- 2024 - AutoTechnica Brussels
- 2023 - EQUIP AUTO Lyon
- 2023 - ExpoMECÂNICA Porto
- 2023 - Automechanika Birmingham
- 2022 (from 2011 to 2022) - Equip Auto Paris, France
- 2022 - Automechanika Frankfurt, Germany
- 2022 - Automechanika Istanbul, Turkey
- 2022 - International Motor Show – Belgrade, Serbia
- 2022 - Autopromotec Bologna, Italy
- 2022 - Motortec Madrid, Spain
- 2022 - Salon de la Franchise Paris, France
- 2021 (from 2017 to 2021) - Colombia auto partes
- 2018 - Russia MOTRIO show
- 2018 - Motor Show Portugal
- 2018 - MOTRIO Ireland Trade Fair
- 2017 - Equipauto Algeria

== Sport Sponsorship ==
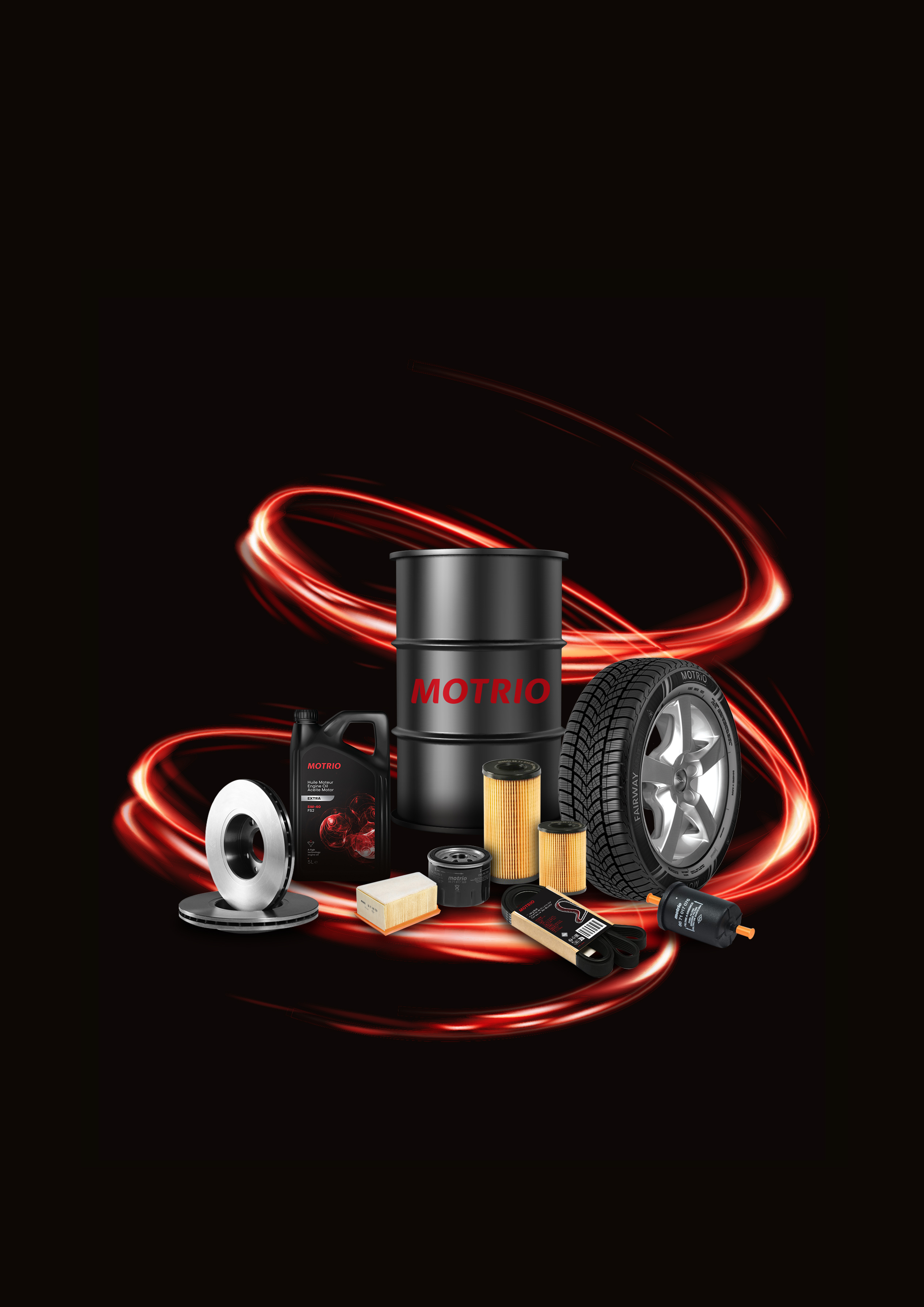
MOTRIO products

Since 2005, MOTRIO has sponsored sports events, car crews and pilots.

- 2022 - Sponsor Copa de España Fútbol Sala
- 2022 (2021 - 2022) - MOTRIO - Safir-Ganova – Cyclocross Team
- 2022 (2015 - 2022) - Sponsorship of the 4L Trophy crew
- 2022 - Sponsor Tour de l’Avenir
- 2022 - Dacia Duster Trophy MOTRIO Cup
- 2018 - MOTRIO Ireland Trade Fair
- 2018 - Motor Show Portugal
- 2018 - Russia MOTRIO show
- 2018 - Azores Rally Gil Antunes pilot sponsoring
- 2017 - XXXV Rally Due Valli
- 2017 - Colombia auto partes
- 2016 - Copa de Marcas Gabriel Casagrande pilot sponsoring
- Since 2015 - 4L Trophy crew sponsoring
- 2014 - Spanish football Ligue
- 2005 and 2007 - Tour de France

== Awards ==
Over the years, MOTRIO has repeatedly won the Allogarage "Meilleurs Garages de France", an award that ranks the best repair centres in France, thus confirming that it is the most network that best satisfies French customers. At Autopromotec 2022, Renault Italia and its network won the GIPA Trophy of Excellence in the "OES Network Satisfaction" category for generalist brands.

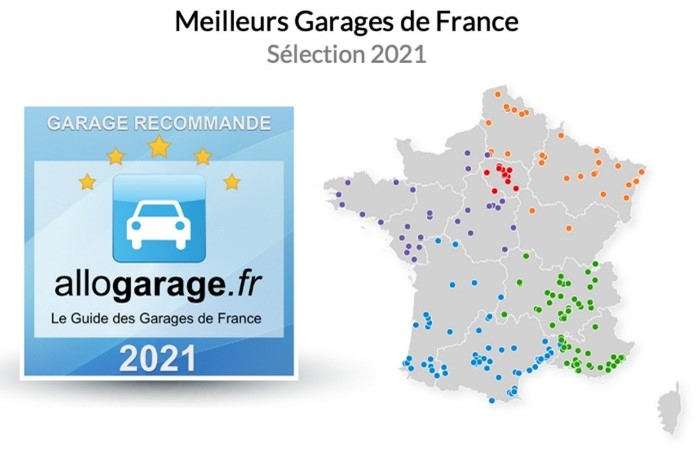
Allogarage award recognises 2021

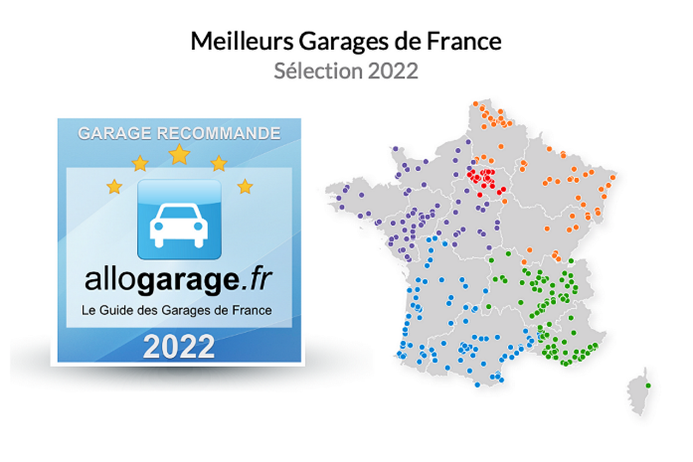
Allogarage award recognises 2022

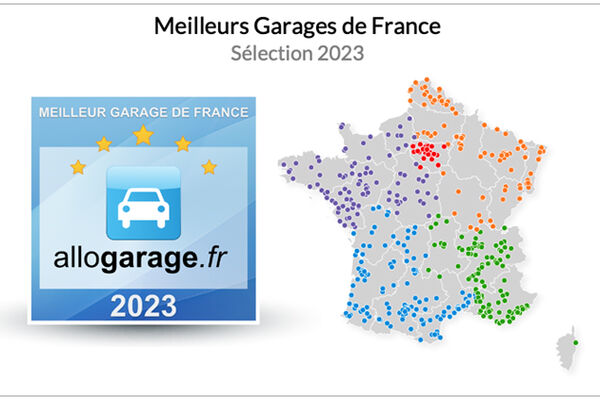
Allogarage award recognises 2023

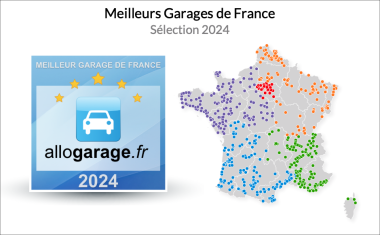
Allogarage award recognises 2024
