= Ripspeed =

- Industry: Automotive parts
- Founded: 1970s
- Headquarters: Edmonton, North London
- Key people: Keith Ripp

Ripspeed is a sub brand of Halfords, one of the leading automotive parts retailer in the United Kingdom. It began as an independent retailer in the 1970s, two decades later the business changed hands and was purchased in 1999 by Halfords, and operates as one of the five subsections of a store if it is present.

== History ==
Keith Ripp (1947–2020), the 1981, 82 and 83 hat-trick British Rallycross Champion with Ford Fiesta 1600, started in a small shop in Pinner green before moving to Hertford Road, Enfield Wash specialising in tuning parts and accessories for Minis as Ripspeed International in 1973.

The motorsport and road car tuning and accessories side progressively grew over the years. By the 1990s, Ripspeed's main rivals were Demon Tweeks and Grand Prix Racewear, both owned by racing drivers, Alan Minshaw and Ray Bellm respectively. In 1996, Ripp sold Ripspeed to Tony Joseph. He then relocated the store from its original premises to a large one on Fore Street, Edmonton, London, with a plan for expansion in other areas. In turn Ripspeed relocated for a second time to an industrial estate in Enfield but this plan came to an abrupt end when the company collapsed due to financial problems after two years of ownership.

Ripp with his two sons Adrian and Jason later started up Xtreme Motorsport, based in Harlow, Essex, which in turn was sold off in 2001. The Ripp brothers later founded R-Tec Auto Design, based in St Albans, Hertfordshire.

In 1994, following a serious crash at Brands Hatch that resulted in spinal injuries, Ripp retired from racing. Ongoing health issues, including a heart condition that later required a triple bypass operation, led him to sell Ripspeed to Halfords, which continues to own and market the brand.

One of the biggest changes was discarding the motorsport retail side of its business to concentrate on the lucrative boy racer market.

Ripspeed itself has had only a limited number of demonstration cars out and about at shows and events. It started with a 1999 Vauxhall Corsa C SXI, which was followed in 1999 with a Ford Focus Ripspeed's current project is a 1991 Nissan 200SX turbo which is a drift car project and has been seen in action at Santa Pod raceway in 2007.

== See also ==
- Keith Ripp
- Halfords homepage
- Ripspeed area of Halfords homepage
