= Super Shops =

American aftermarket auto parts store (1963- 1998)

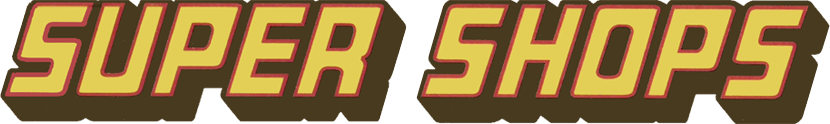
- Type: Private
- Industry: Retail
- Founded: July 1, 1963; 63 years ago in San Bernardino, California, U.S. as San Bernardino Racing Equipment
- Founder: Harry Eberlin
- Defunct: 1998; 28 years ago
- Fate: Liquidated
- Headquarters: San Bernardino
- Number of locations: 165 (at peak)
- Area served: United States
- Products: Auto parts
- Owner: Harry Eberlin

Super Shops Automotive Performance Centers was an American chain of 165 aftermarket auto parts stores which operated from 1963 to 1998. The chain was founded as a single store on July 1, 1963, by Harry Eberlin, a United States Air Force Veteran and freelance auto-parts dealer. Initially named San Bernardino Racing Equipment, the first store was located at 25824 East Baseline Road in San Bernardino, California. After the opening of several stores, the corporation changed names in 1977 from San Bernardino Racing Equipment Inc. to Super Shops, Inc. The chain rebranded its stores as Super Shops Automotive Performance Centers in 1978. The Super Shops chain sponsored racing events and National Hot Rod Association drag racing teams. The corporation went out of business in 1998 due to a series of bad business decisions (primarily from a newly appointed CEO) and financial debt.

The Super Shops trademarks and corporate name were later registered with the United States Patent and Trademark Office by an unrelated El Cajon based firm in 2003 and cancelled in 2012.

Since 2013, the Super Shops trademarks and corporate name were obtained by a nostalgia group of former workers and customers to provide the sale of T-shirts and other memorabilia.

== History ==
=== 1960s ===
Super Shops was originally a single location Speed Shop, operating under the name "San Bernardino Racing Equipment" at 25824 East Baseline Road in San Bernardino, California. It was founded, owned and operated by Harry Eberlin. Prior to this first location opening, Eberlin would go to street racing locations, hangouts, drag strips and swap meets where he would sell speed parts out of the trunk of his car.

Eberlin spent many long hours at the shop, and personally negotiated equipment purchases with other notable legends of the industry. He quickly won the loyalty of local racers who had previously been traveling long distances to find the parts they needed.

=== 1970s ===
The first expansion of Eberlin's operations took place when he opened his second location at 3893 Seventh Street, in Riverside, California. This second location opened on June 4, 1972. Driven by the success of the first and second locations, Harry continued to expand, opening a third location at 1249 West Holt Boulevard in Ontario, California, on March 30, 1973. The year 1974 saw the addition of his fourth location at 4550 University Avenue in San Diego, California, on March 22, 1974. A fifth location was added in Garden Grove in 1975, with additional locations at Long Beach in 1976, Covina and Van Nuys in 1977, and Sacramento in 1978.

The year 1978 saw the first store opening outside the state of California—at 2990 South State Street in Salt Lake City, Utah. This store opened on June 19, 1978. One additional California location was opened at 415 West Valley Boulevard in San Gabriel on June 1, 1978. A second out-of-state location came online at 16 West Camelback in Phoenix, Arizona, on November 23, 1978.

Tucson, Arizona; Lakewood, Colorado; and San Jose, California; came online in 1979, bringing the number of stores in operation to 15. During the 1970s, there was one store that ended up relocating because a landlord refused to renew a lease with reasonable terms.

Other than that, Eberlin was proud to point out that no store had ever been closed in the history of the chain (up to the moment of bankruptcy in 1998).

=== 1980s ===
With Eberlin now operating a 15-store chain of speed shops, he turned his attention to his long-running dream of operating a nationwide chain of automotive performance centers, appealing to the masses. Starting in 1980, aggressive expansion took place. Eberlin had long owned the name "Super Shops"—he registered it on January 10, 1972.

Super Shops Automotive Performance Centers was the official name now, and from 1980 until the end of 1989, 128 stores were opened, bringing the total store count to 143. A new store was opening on an average of just over once per month, and a simultaneous marketing, hiring, training and selling juggernaut had been created on the fly. The latter half of the 1980s saw Super Shops sponsoring numerous race teams in various classes of competition, operating race support trailers sponsored by Mallory and Erson, and becoming highly involved with Top Fuel through sponsorship of Big Daddy Don Garlits, and later, Eddie and Ercie Hill.

=== 1990s ===
On August 19, 1990 a triple homicide occurred at the Tustin Super Shops location. 3 employees were killed "Execution Style" during the course of a robbery. The victims were identified as Darrell Esgar, Chad Chadwick, and Russel B. Williams.

By the year 1992, Super Shops was operating 165 retail locations, three distribution centers (San Bernardino, Grand Prairie, Texas, and Jacksonville, Florida), two corporate head offices (Victoria Court and Tippecanoe, in San Bernardino), two speed parts manufacturers (Mallory and Erson) and a mail order Operation (ASAP). In addition to these operations, the corporation owned and operated two corporate jets (a Cessna Citation 1 and a Dassault Falcon 50), and Eberlin had a portfolio of real estate holdings named "HRE Development Corporation" consisting of many store locations and other key properties.

The late 1990s saw a proliferation of vehicles becoming "black box automobile systems" (vehicles no longer easily modified by their owners due to computers and emissions systems being interdependent), along with an apparent decline of car owners as car hobbyists per-capita. As a result, few aftermarket parts manufacturers were quick to respond with the types of innovative products we now see today—and this "moment of hesitation" had a dramatic negative impact on the nationwide network of performance parts suppliers, including Super Shops. Many Speed Shops faded away or closed abruptly during this time. This was not the single cause, but was one of the major causes that led to the eventual liquidation of Super Shops in 1998.

In 2016, a former customer asked Ed Steele, a former area manager, the reason for the closing of Super Shops. Steele responded with his personal opinion based on his direct discussions with Harry and his personal experiences.

=== Aftermath ===
Super Shops remains a topic of discussion among former customers and employees. At its peak, the company employed more than 1,300 people. Between 1963 and 1998, approximately 15,000 employees were hired, resigned, or were terminated. Online resources related to the company include social media pages and websites featuring historical information and memorabilia from the period when the stores were in operation.

== Commercials ==
Super Shops advertised heavily on the radio. An announcer, Doug Collins, would forcefully tell about the latest parts deals of the week, with hard rock music in the background. Super Shops radio ads used a stock "rock" music generic background with drag racing sound effects in the background. The music borrowed heavily from Santana's "All I Ever Wanted". Later, Harry commissioned a "custom" original music track for the background and retained the drag racing sounds.
