= Allen Tire Company =

Coordinates: 33°49′58″N 118°7′4″W

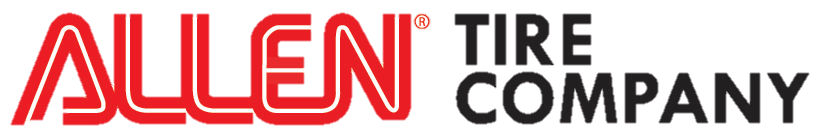
- Type: Private
- Industry: Retail
- Founded: 1973
- Headquarters: Southern California, Lakewood, California, U.S.
- Number of locations: 20
- Products: Motor vehicle tires
- Website: www.allentire.com

Allen Tire Company is a tire and wheel retailer in Southern California, USA, established in 1973, with 18 locations throughout the area. Modern Tire Dealer publishes lists of the top 100 independent tire store chains; Allen first appeared at around 50th place during the first decade of the twenty-first century. In December of 2020, it was acquired by Monro Inc.

== Locations ==
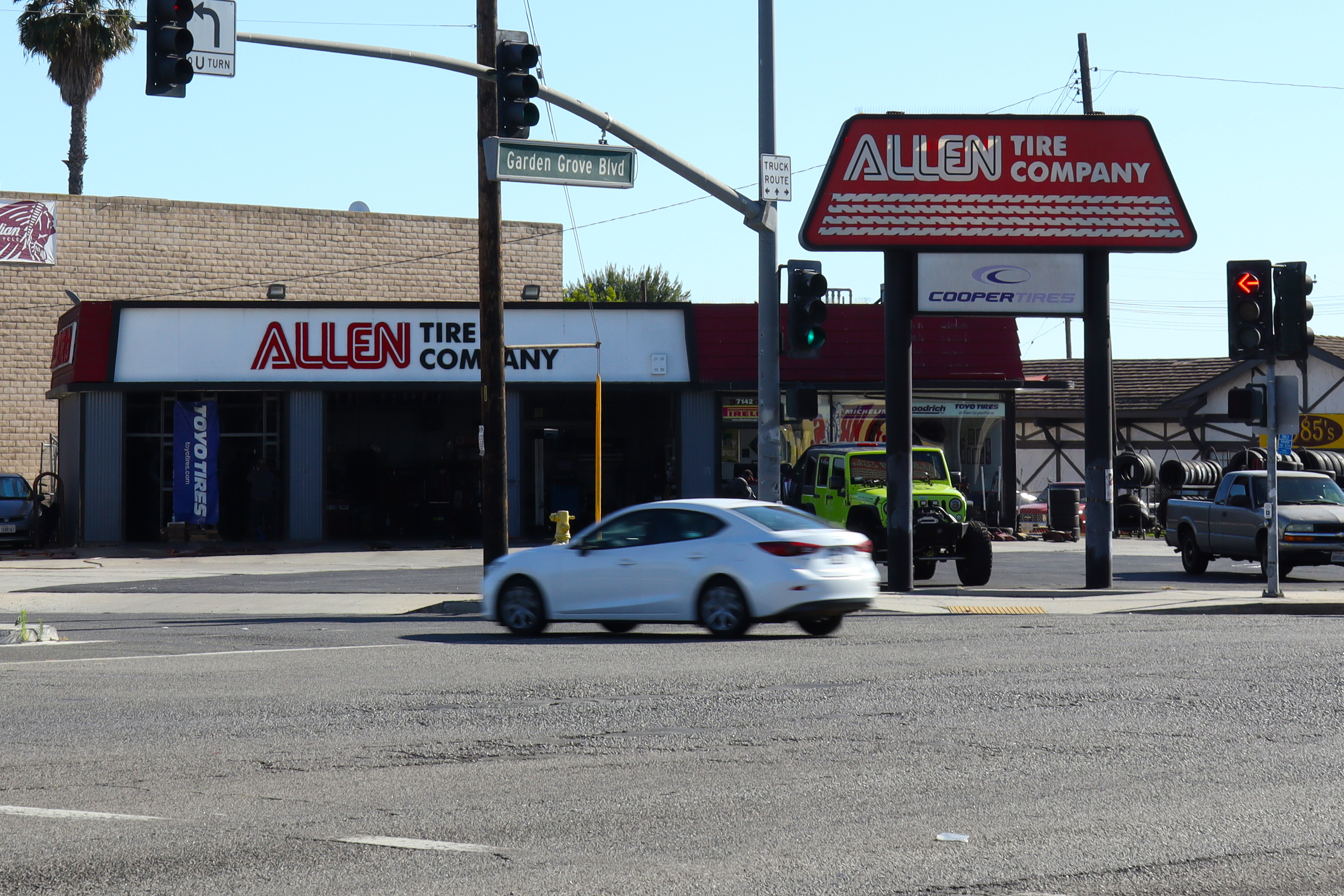
Allen Tire Company's Westminster facility

As of 2017, the company had locations in Anaheim, Costa Mesa, Downey, Fullerton, Fountain Valley, Hemet, Huntington Beach, Lake Forest, Lakewood, Mission Viejo, Palm Springs, two in Riverside, two in Santa Ana, Torrance, Westminster and Yorba Linda.
