= JC Whitney =

Automotive parts retailer

- Company type: Subsidiary
- Industry: Automotive
- Founded: Chicago, IL 1915
- Headquarters: Torrance, CA
- Products: Aftermarket Automotive Parts and Accessories
- Parent: CarParts.com
- Website: JC Whitney

JC Whitney is a retailer of aftermarket automotive parts and accessories. It was acquired by CarParts.com (formerly U.S. Auto Parts Network, Inc.), a publicly traded American online provider of aftermarket auto parts in 2010. In July 2020, JC Whitney was merged into CarParts.com.

== History ==
JC Whitney began in 1915 as The Warshawsky Company, a scrap metal yard on the South Side of Chicago. The company's founder was Lithuanian immigrant Israel Warshawsky. Throughout World War I, Warshawsky bought failed auto manufacturers and added new parts to his inventory. The Warshawsky Company continued to grow, even during the Great Depression. The company closed its Chicago store and opened a new location in LaSalle, Illinois, in 1997.

In 1934, Israel's son Roy joined his father at the company after graduating from the University of Chicago. Roy proposed expanding from the Chicago area with a nationwide catalog and placed an ad in Popular Mechanics for sixty dollars. The ad offered readers a "giant auto parts catalog" for 25¢. Response to the ad was huge.

Roy took charge after his father's death in 1943. He continued to grow the business through World War II, always developing new strategies in response to changing customer needs. Roy retired in 1991.

On June 26, 2002, The Riverside Company acquired JC Whitney. In 2007, The Riverside Company created Whitney Automotive Group, which owned other companies such as CarParts.com, StylinTrucks.com, and AllBikeSupershop.com. On August 17, 2010, JCWhitney (along with the rest of Whitney Automotive Group) was acquired by U.S. Auto Parts for $27.5 million.

In July 2020, JC Whitney was merged into CarParts.com. JC Whitney will also launch a new line of accessories for Jeep and truck owners on its new website.

== LaSalle, Illinois, location ==
The LaSalle, Illinois, facility contains the expansive distribution center. The facility had been a public retail outlet center until August 2019; the area has been repurposed to expand the distribution center. This facility is also affiliated with Carparts.com. As recently as May 2020, the company's customer service was handled in the Philippines. The LaSalle call center and the Independence, Ohio call centers have both been closed. Parent company CarParts.com has also closed its Carson, California distribution facility and added distribution centers in Chesapeake, Virginia (opened 2016), and Las Vegas, Nevada (opened in 2019).
