= Rovers North =

American Land Rover parts dealer

- Company type: Private
- Industry: Automotive Parts
- Founded: 1979
- Headquarters: Westford, Vermont, United States
- Key people: Mark Letorney, founder Andrea Letorney, founder Calef Letorney, CEO
- Number of employees: 34+
- Website: RoversNorth.com

Rovers North Inc is a privately held Land Rover parts dealer located in Westford, Vermont, United States. The company supports all original Land Rover models specializing in the Defender, Series II and III. They offer the entire range of Land Rover Genuine Parts direct from Land Rover UK, as well as publish North America's largest Land Rover publication, Rovers Magazine.

Mark and Andrea Letorney founded the company in 1979. In June of 2024, Rovers North became 100% employee owned when the Letorney family sold their shares of the company to a trust, creating an employee stock ownership plan.

Rovers North has been a direct distributor of Land Rover Genuine Parts since 1985. Rovers North offers its ProLine parts alongside the genuine parts. Sourced from a variety of manufacturers, ProLine is an alternative when a Genuine Part is no longer available or a lower cost replacement is preferred.

Rovers North was featured in the May 1994 Car and Driver article titled "Eight Miles, Seven Hours".
