= Autodoc =

Online shop for auto parts

AUTODOC SE
- Type: European public limited company (Societas Europaea)
- Industry: E-commerce, automotive parts retail
- Founded: 1 May 2008; 18 years ago
- Headquarters: Berlin, Germany
- Area served: Europe
- Key people: Dmitri Zadorojnii (CEO); Lennart Schmidt (CFO); Alexei Kletenkov (Chair of the Supervisory Board)
- Products: Automotive parts, accessories, tools, oils and fluids
- Brands: Own brands: RIDEX, STARK, goCORE
- Revenue: ▲€1.808 billion (2025)
- Net income: €58.8 million (2025)
- Number of employees: 5,500+ (2025)
- Website: www.autodoc.eu

AUTODOC SE is an e-commerce company selling auto parts and related products in 27 European countries. Its main customers are individuals and smaller workshops. The company sells via its online shops, mobile app, AUTODOC MARKETPLACE, and third-party marketplaces.

== History ==
AUTODOC was founded in 2008 as E&S Pkwteile GmbH by Alexej Erdle, Max Wegner, and Vitalij Kungel. In its early years, the company was located in Berlin-Weißensee. Expansion into Austria and Switzerland began in 2011, followed by entry into the UK, France, Italy, and Spain in 2012.

In 2015, the company rebranded as AUTODOC GmbH. By 2016, its annual revenue exceeded €100 million, and in 2017, it surpassed €250 million. In 2018, AUTODOC expanded its product range to include spare parts for trucks and other commercial vehicles.

In 2018, the company was recognized by the Financial Times as one of the fastest-growing companies in Europe based on revenue.

In 2019, AUTODOC signed a partnership with TecAlliance, a data company, to integrate B2B platform Order Manager, a multifunctional tool for the entire process from order to invoice.

In September 2021, AUTODOC changed its legal form from a GmbH to an Aktiengesellschaft (AG). Since November 2022, the company has operated as AUTODOC SE (Societas Europaea).

The company's annual revenue exceeded €1 billion for the first time in 2021.

In 2024, AUTODOC had an annual revenue of around €1.6 billion.

In 2025, the company sold 72.5 million items (up 12.4% from 16.8 million in 2024), with a total of 18.9 million orders, and 9.3 million active customers (up 10.4% from 8.4 million in 2024).

Between 2024 and 2025, the total number of customers increased by 16.9%, bringing the total number of customers since the company's foundation in 2008 to 30 million.

In 2026, AUTODOC received the German Onlineshop Award for the third consecutive year, achieving a rating of 9 out of 10 across the categories of Marketing & Design, Usability, and Customer Service & Customer Experience.

== Operations and logistics ==
AUTODOC operates in 27 European countries and employs more than 5,000 people across 13 locations, including the headquarters in Berlin, a tech hub in Lisbon, Portugal, and further locations in. Belgium, the Czech Republic, France, Germany, Italy, Kazakhstan, Luxembourg, Moldova, the Netherlands, Poland, Portugal, Ukraine, and the United Kingdom.

The company’s logistical infrastructure is centred around four hubs, with the largest in Szczecin, Poland, major regional warehouses in Cheb, Czech Republic, and Berlin, Germany, and a distribution centre serving the Western European market in Ghent, Belgium. The Szczecin logistics centre was opened in 2018 and expanded with a semi-automated distribution centre in September 2020. In December 2022, a new logistics centre was completed with 40,000 m² of warehouse space, bringing the company's total warehouse area in Szczecin to approximately 70,000 m².

An average of 200,000 units per day were shipped from the company's warehouses in 2025.

== Products and services ==
AUTODOC's product range includes around 7.8 million spare parts for cars, trucks, and motorcycles from the engine, chassis, lighting, electrical, ventilation, and tyre sectors for over 75,000 vehicle models from approximately 2,700 manufacturers (including 176 car brands, 23 truck brands, and 154 motorcycle brands), available for purchase through the company's website or app and third-party marketplaces. Through AUTODOC MARKETPLACE, third-party sellers can also offer their products for sale on the company's online shop.

Between 2024 and 2025, the product portfolio grew by around 16.2%, from 6.7 million to 7.8 million products.

The AUTODOC app was launched in 2016 and has been installed more than 15 million times as of 2025, with approximately 141 million downloads since launch.

AUTODOC also provides car owners with useful information via its online platforms. The company publishes articles, manuals, and video tutorials on vehicle maintenance and repair. These materials can be accessed via the AUTODOC blog and AUTODOC CLUB. The AUTODOC CLUB website and app, launched in 2020, offers more than 2,500 PDF manuals and videos, as well as tools for tracking vehicle expenses and maintenance history.

The AUTODOC PLUS subscription programme is available in a number of countries, offering benefits such as priority order status, member discounts, and extra bonus credits when ordering.

The online B2B platform AUTODOC PRO is aimed at garages and independent mechanics. Following its successful launch in France in 2022, the service has since expanded to Austria, Belgium, Germany, Italy, and the Netherlands.

The company has three private car parts brands, RIDEX, STARK, and goCORE. 17.7 million units from these brands were sold in 2025, and RIDEX is the overall best-selling brand on AUTODOC. The own-brand range expanded by 19.7% to more than 94,000 items.

== Motorsport sponsorship ==
The company was an official partner of the ADAC Rally Masters in 2018. In 2019, it served as an official partner of the FIA World Rally Championship (WRC), sponsoring all European rounds of the season.
