= Commercial Tire =

US tire store chain

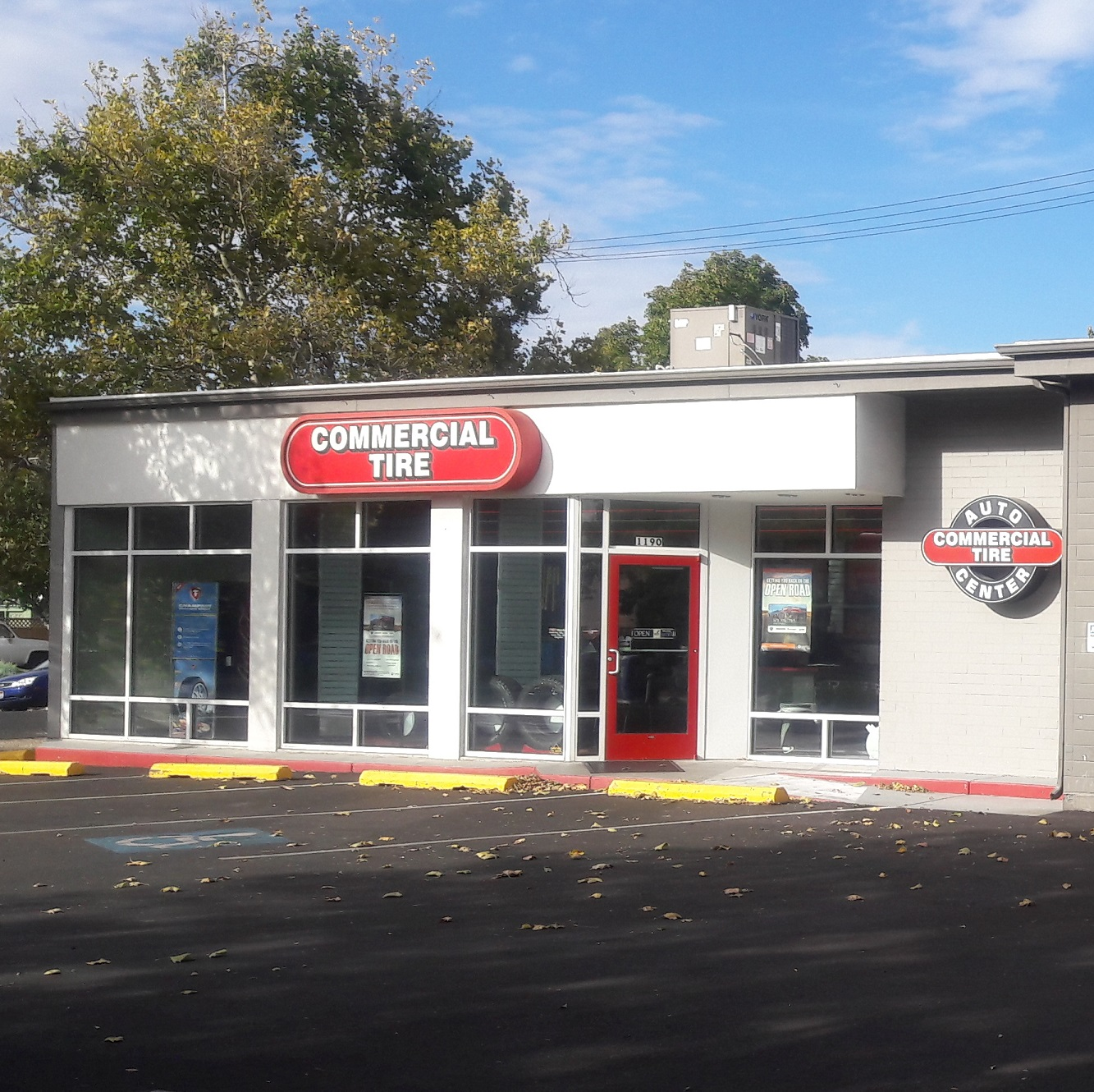
- Company type: Private
- Industry: Independent Tire Retailer, Commercial Tire Dealer
- Founded: Boise, Idaho, United States (1968)
- Headquarters: Meridian, Idaho, United States
- Number of locations: Over 40 stores across Idaho, Oregon, Washington, and Utah
- Key people: Bob Schwenkfelder, Trent Schwenkfelder
- Products: Tires, Shocks and Struts, Car Batteries
- Services: Motor Oil Change, Wheel alignment, Brake Services, Fluid Flushes
- Website: www.commercialtire.com

Commercial Tire is a chain of tire stores located in the United States, providing tires and related services to owners of passenger, commercial, and agricultural vehicles.

== History ==
The original store was founded in 1968 by J.R. "Bob" Schwenkfelder, in downtown Boise, Idaho. The store remains active to this day among an ever-growing expansion of stores throughout Idaho, Oregon, Washington, and Utah. Their corporate headquarters resides in Meridian, Idaho, and is managed by Bob and his son Trent.

An important factor in the company's success was Bob's acquiring of the Bridgestone tire line in 1969, a time when it was fairly new to the US market and yet to grow popular. Bridgestone is still one of Commercial Tire's featured tire brands, along with Firestone, Cooper, and Yokohama tires.

== Recognition ==
In 2015, industry news magazine Modern Tire Dealer listed Commercial Tire under their Top 100 Independent Tire Dealers and Top 25 Commercial Tire Dealers, ranked #30 and #16 respectively. Bob has also received honorable mention by the Idaho Business Review for his work as an influential CEO.

== Media ==
Featured on YouTube and the Commercial Tire website is the Mechanic Minute, a video series with tips on maintaining vehicles and technical information on tires. The videos are also supplemented with a blog on their site.
