= Advanced FLOW engineering =

Manufacturing company in California, US

- Industry: Automotive cold air intake systems
- Founded: 1999
- Headquarters: Corona, California, United States
- Products: Pro 5R, Pro Guard 7 and Pro Dry S

Advanced FLOW engineering (aFe) is a manufacturer company founded in 1999 and headquartered in Corona, California, United States, in two facilities: the 77,000 sq ft (7,200 m^{2}) headquarters and manufacturing facilities; and the 87,000 sq ft (8,100 m^{2}) warehouse and R&D facility, which was added in 2012.

== History ==
The aFe product line includes over 2,300 applications, all of which are manufactured in Corona, California. The aFe Power product line-up includes air filters, air intake and exhaust systems for most late-model cars and trucks.

The Blade Runner inlet manifold was released in 2007. In the fall of 2007, aFe added diesel fluid filters for diesel applications. In 2008, aFe introduced the Aries 1 and Aries 2 filters and intakes for popular powersport applications. In 2009, the company released the Bladerunner intercooler for sport compacts.

In 2011, the company released a new turbocharger and Scorcher Programmer product lines.

aFe produces three versions of air filter media, including their original Pro 5R, Pro Guard 7 and Pro Dry S. The Pro 5R media is a five-layer cotton gauze media. The patented Pro-Guard 7 combined the Pro 5R media with the addition of two layers of synthetic media. Both of these media require filter-recharging oil. The Pro Dry S media is a three-layer synthetic media and requires no filter oil.

aFe specializes in the diesel truck performance aftermarket with a line-up of products for these applications. aFe's Pro Guard D2 filter program includes oil, fuel and transmission filters.

== Milestones and awards ==
aFe Power was an associate sponsor of Allan Pflueger's and Chuck Foreman's off-road racing trucks. In 2007, Chuck Foreman's Baja 1000 Pflueger racing truck logged over 1,400 miles (2,300 km), winning the race using the Pro Guard 7 filter.

In 2007, it was awarded "Editors Choice Product of the Year" by an off-road business magazine. In 2009 and 2010, aFe was awarded the SEMA Global Media Award.
