= List of tire companies =

This is a list of notable tire manufacturers and companies.

Tire Manufacturers and Companies
Company	Country	Found.	Brands
Apollo Tyres	India	1972	Apollo, Vredestein, Bearway, Kaizen, Maloya, Regal
Atturo	US	2009	Atturo
Belshina	Belarus	1965	Belshina
Birla Tyres	India	1991	Birla Tyre
BKT Tires	India	1987	BKT Tyres
Bob Jane T-Marts	Australia	1965	Bob Jane T-Marts
Bridgestone	Japan	1931	Bridgestone, Firestone, Seiberling, Dayton, Fuzion, Fireforce (South Africa), Supercat (Australia and New Zealand)
Camso	Canada	1982	Camso Tyres
Carlisle	US	1917	Carlisle Transportation Products, Carlstar
Casumina	Vietnam	1976	Casumina, Euromina
CEAT	India	1924	CEAT, Camso Tyres
Cheng Shin Rubber	Taiwan	1967	Cheng Shin, Maxxis, CST, Presa
Continental	Germany	1871	Continental, Barum, General Tire, Gislaved, Hoosier Racing Tire, Matador, Semperit, Uniroyal (Europe), Euzkadi, Mabor, Viking
Deestone	Thailand	1977	Deestone, Thunderer
DMACK	UK	2008	DMACK
Doublestar	China	1921	Doublestar
Federal Corporation	Taiwan	1954	Federal, Hero
Ghandhara Tyre	Pakistan	1963	General
Giti	Singapore	1951	Giti Tire, Dextero, Greatwall, GT Radial, Hualin, Primewell, Roadpro, Runway
Goodyear	US	1898	Goodyear, Douglas, Fulda, Kelly Tires, Sava, Dunlop (North America, Europe, Australia and New Zealand), Cooper (owns brands Cooper Tires, Avon Tyres, Mastercraft Tires, Mickey Thompson Tires & Wheels, Roadmaster Tires, Starfire Tires), Dębica
Hangzhou Zhongce	China	1958	Chaoyang, CYT, Goodride, Westlake, Yartu
Hankook	South Korea	1941	Hankook, Aurora, Kingstar, Laufenn
Hoosier Racing Tire	US	1957	Hoosier
Hutchinson SA	France	1957	Hutchinson Tires
Inoue Rubber	Japan	1926	IRC Tires
J K Tyre	India	1951	J K Tyre
Kelani Tyres	Sri Lanka	1990	CEAT
Kenda Rubber	Taiwan	1962	Kenda, Kenda radial
Kumho Tires	South Korea	1960	Kumho, Admiral, Marshal, Trailfinder, Zetum,
MRF	India	1946	MRF Tyres
Michelin Group	France	1889	Michelin, BFGoodrich, Kleber, Achilles, Corsa, Kormoran, Stomil, TBC Corporation 50% (owns brands Big O Tires, Cordovan, National Tire, Multi-Mile ,Sigma), Tigar Tyres, Uniroyal (North America), Orium, Riken, Strial, Taurus
Nankang Rubber	Taiwan	1959	Nankang, GeoStar, MileStar, Provato, Sonar, Star Performer TNG
Nexen Tire	South Korea	1942	Nexen, Capitol (joint venture), Lexani, Roadstone
Nokian Tyres	Finland	1898	Nokian, Nordman
Omni United	Singapore	2003	American Tourer, Patriot Tires, Radar Tires, RoadLux, Tecnica, Timberland Tires
Panasonic	Japan	1953	Panaracer
Petlas	Turkey	1976	Petlas
Pirelli	Italy	1872	Pirelli, Metzeler, Agom, Courier, Formula
Ralf Bohle GmbH	Germany	1922	Impac, Schwalbe
Sentury Tire	China	1992	Delinte, Landsail, Groundspeed, Pantera
Shandong Linglong Tire Co	China	1975	Linglong, Atlas, Crosswind, Evoluxx, Geen Max,Infinity, Leao
Shanghai Huayi	China	1996	Double Coin ,Warrior ,Wynstar
Starco	Denmark	1962	Tusker
Sumitomo Rubber	Japan	1909	Sumitomo, Falken, TBC Corporation 50% (owns brands Big O Tires, Cordovan, National Tire, Multi-Mile ,Sigma), Dunlop (Japan, Latin America, Asia and Africa), Blacklion Tires, Ohtsu, Solar, Vanderbilt
Titan Tire Corporation	US	1993	Titan, Caterpillar tires, Goodyear farm tires
Tigar Tyres	Serbia	1959	Tigar
Toyo Tire & Rubber	Japan	1945	Toyo, Nitto, Silverstone
Trayal Corporation	Serbia	1955	Trayal (farm tires)
Triangle Group	China	1976	Triangle, Diamondback
TVS Srichakra	India	1982	Eurogrip Tyres
Vittoria	Italy	1953	Vittoria, Geax
Vogue Tyre	US	1914	Vogue
Yokohama Rubber	Japan	1917	Yokohama, Advan
Zenises	Dubai	2014	Z Tyres, T Tyres, Triangle, Ardent, Arisun, Chaoyang, Goodride, iLink, Kapsen, Trazano, Westlake
