= TireHub =

- Type: Limited liability company
- Founded: July 2018; 8 years ago
- Headquarters: Dunwoody, Georgia
- Products: Automotive tires and equipment
- Parent: Goodyear Tire; Bridgestone Americas (2018–present)
- Website: www.tirehub.com

TireHub is a wholesale tire distributor created from a joint venture. The company is headquartered in Dunwoody, Georgia.

== History ==
In July 2018, Goodyear Tire and Rubber Company and Bridgestone Americas announced the creation of TireHub, a joint wholesale distribution network across the United States. At the same time, Goodyear also announced that it was ending its distribution relationship with American Tire Distributors, which is the largest tire wholesaler in the US. In October 2022, Cooper Tire & Rubber Company announced Tirehub would become an authorized national distributor for Cooper tires.

On May 1, 2023, Mickey Thompson Tires & Wheels announced Tirehub is now an authorized national distributor for Mickey Thompson Tires. As of 2023, the company retains a network of 80 TireHub Distribution Centers, adding roughly 12 in the year prior to expand its regional capabilities.

In January 2024, TireHub announced it had launched its TireHub Plus program, which is a suite of tools and services for independent tire dealers.

== Company operations ==
The company is a 50–50 split between the two companies, and run by a separate management team. Its headquarters are located in Metro Atlanta, in the northern suburbs of Dunwoody, Georgia. It has 80 locations across the country.

The company carries the brands:

- Goodyear Tire and Rubber Company brands
  - Goodyear (since 2018)
  - Kelly-Springfield (since 2018)
  - Dunlop (since 2018)
  - Douglas
  - Cooper (since 2022)
  - StarFire (since 2022)
  - Mickey Thompson (since 2023)
- Bridgestone brands
  - Bridgestone (since 2018)
  - Firestone (since 2018)
  - Fuzion (since 2018)
  - SureDrive
  - LeMans (since 2018)
- Pirelli (since 2025)
- Toyo (since 2018)
- Achilles
- Vantage
- OmniTrail
