= Titan Tire Corporation =

American tire corporation

Titan International Inc
- Traded as: NYSE: TWI

Titan Tire Corporation
- Industry: Tires
- Predecessor: Dyneer Corporation, Pirelli Armstrong Tire Corporation, Fidelity Tire, Goodyear Farm Tires, Continental AG, Denman Tire
- Founded: 1993; 33 years ago
- Founder: Maurice M. Taylor Jr.
- Headquarters: Quincy, Illinois, United States
- Number of locations: Des Moines, Iowa, US; Freeport, Illinois, US; Bryan, Ohio, US; Union City, Tennessee US; São Paulo, Brazil
- Revenue: ▼US$21.821 billion (2023)
- Operating income: ▼US$148.7 Million (2023)
- Net income: ▼US$83.7 million (2023)
- Total assets: ▲US$1.289 billion (2023)
- Total equity: ▼US$467.4 million (2023)
- Number of employees: 6,900 (2023)
- Parent: Titan International
- Website: https://www.titan-intl.com/

The Titan Tire Corporation is an American tire corporation formed in 1993 by Maurice M. Taylor Jr., then owner of Titan Wheel, purchased the Dyneer Corporation, manufacturer various off-road tires. Titan is one of the largest manufacturer of off-road tires in North America. It continued expanding its product offering and reach by purchasing the off-road tire assets of Pirelli Armstrong Tire Corporation in 1994. In 1997, Titan International split Titan Tire Corporation into a subsidiary of (NYSE: TWI).

Titan purchased the assets of Fidelity Tire, of Natchez, Mississippi, through bankruptcy Court in 1998, and the company refocused with the sale of its golf-cart, all-terrain vehicle, and lawn tractor tires and facilities in Clinton, Tennessee, and Slinger, Wisconsin, to the Carlisle Tire & Wheel Company in 2000.

In 2005, Titan purchased the farm tire business of Goodyear, and continues manufacturing Goodyear agricultural tires under license. This acquisition included the plant in Freeport, Illinois. Titan again expanded in 2006 with the purchase of Continental AG's off-the-road (OTR) tire assets in Bryan, Ohio. Titan acquired it for about $53 million.

In 2010, Titan purchased the assets of Leavittsburg, Ohio, based Denman Tire in bankruptcy court for US$4.4 million. This purchase includes the consumer-related tires (on-road) as well, which Titan is considering to divest.

In November 2011, Titan purchased Goodyear's Union City, Tennessee, plant four months after Goodyear closed it. It initially will be used for mixing raw materials for other Titan production facilities.

Titan announced that it had purchased the assets of Goodyear's Latin American off-road tire business for US$98.6 million. This includes the plant in São Paulo, Brazil, and a licensing agreement that allows Titan to continue manufacturing under the Goodyear brand, similar to its 2005 purchase of Goodyear's US farm tire assets.

Titan has manufactured tires for Caterpillar under the Caterpillar brand since 1999. OEM customers include John Deere, AGCO, Case IH/Case Construction, New Holland, Caterpillar and Kubota.

Titan manufactures under the Titan and Goodyear brands.

== Environmental Concerns ==
In October 2010, the U.S. Environmental Protection Agency (EPA) sued Titan Tire Corp. and Dico Inc. for the demolition of three buildings in Des Moines, Iowa, contaminated with hazardous polychlorinated biphenyls (PCBs). These actions by the companies led to significant taxpayer expenses, resulting in the establishment of a Superfund cleanup site in Ottumwa where contaminated steel beams from the demolished buildings were dumped. Dico's property had previously been identified as a source of water contamination, and both companies faced allegations of neglecting environmental regulations.

In 2007, Titan Tire, without prior EPA notification, had three buildings on Dico's property demolished, and the steel beams, which contained PCBs, were taken to Southern Iowa Mechanical's (SIM) property. Judge Robert Pratt ruled against the companies, noting Dico's prior knowledge of the contamination and imposing fines totaling nearly $4.6 million. Both companies were held accountable for ongoing and future EPA-related costs at the Ottumwa site.

== Criticism ==
During the 2022 Russian invasion of Ukraine, Titan refused to join the international community and withdraw from the Russian market. Research from Yale University updated on April 28, 2022 identifying how companies were reacting to Russia's invasion identified Titan in the worst category of "Digging In", meaning Defying Demands for Exit: companies defying demands for exit/reduction of activities.

== See also ==
- List of tire companies
