= Triangle Group =

Chinese tire manufacturer

- Type: Private
- Industry: Tire manufacturing
- Founded: 1976; 50 years ago
- Headquarters: Weihai, Shandong, China
- Products: Passenger car tires, truck tires, winter tires, XC tires, construction equipment tires, bias tires, trailer tires
- Website: triangle.com.cn

Triangle Group (Chinese: 三角輪胎; also known as Triangle Tyre) is a Chinese tire company that manufactures a range of tires for vehicles from passenger cars to construction equipment and tires fit for special purposes under the Triangle and DIAMONDBACK brands. As of 2015 it is the 14th largest tire maker in the world according to Tyres & Accessories.

== History ==
Triangle Group was founded by the Weihai government in 1976. Lacking a car industry in China, the company supplied tiny tires to Indonesian street-sweepers rubbish carts in the following years. The company grew in size but did not make money until in 1993 with the installment of new management, Triangle reworked itself into a competitive enterprise. In making dramatic reforms, the company invested in new, more modern production and implemented strict workforce discipline. The restructuring would continue into the 2000s, when the company considered a public offering and so brought its accounting to developed world standards and continuously invested in more sophisticated manufacturing lines. These efforts to make itself a top league tire maker would be the subject of a profile article in The Economist during June 2008.

In recent years, the company has focused more on research and development, announcing a desire to become a technology leader, through research partnerships with universities. In 2011, it signed an agreement with the University of Akron to work together on polymer research and also opened an office in the same town of Akron, Ohio with plans for 30 employees. It partnered up in 2012 with the Harbin Institute of Technology to carry out research on designing and manufacturing tires for large-bodied aircraft, enabling Triangle to compete with two other companies in China that already produce such tires.

In 2015, Triangle Group announced its first venture into the U.S. market with the opening of their new North American headquarters in Franklin, Tennessee inside the Nashville Metropolitan Area, and in late 2017 selected Edgecombe County, North Carolina as the location for its first manufacturing facility in the United States where it expects to manufacture six million tires annually. In May 2022 the company has scrapped a project due to "a change in investment environment" and other factors such as COVID.

== Plants ==
All Triangle Tire factories are located in Weihai prefecture-level city, Shandong province, eastern China:

- Huasheng Plant specializes in the production of passenger vehicle tires and giant tires, radial tires engineering.
- Huamao Plant specializes in the production of commercial vehicle tires.
- Huayang Plant specializes in the production of high-performance tires for passenger cars and SUVs.
- Huada Plant specializes in tire retreading.
- Huaxin Plant specializes in bias tire engineering.

== Products ==
The company works as a strategic partner and supplier to many overseas companies. It has struck partnerships with Caterpillar, Volvo, and Goodyear. In terms of market share success, the company's most dominant placement is in the off the road (OTR) category, which includes tires for mining, construction, and other industrial uses. It is the 4th largest manufacturer of OTR tires with the company shipping 90% of its OTR stock to export markets.

At the start of 2016, Triangle truck and bus tyres started being distributed by multinational distributor Zenises.

In December 2021 the company has launched a mobile app for Android and iOS smartphones. It includes all products for the European market, from passenger to TBR and earthmoving tires.
