= Deestone =

Thai tyre manufacturer

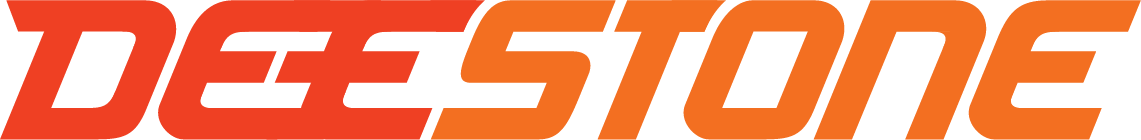
- Company type: Private
- Industry: Tires Manufacturing
- Founded: 1977
- Founder: Suvit Vongsariyavanich
- Headquarters: Samut Sakhon, Thailand
- Key people: Suvit Vongsariyavanich (Founder)
- Number of employees: 10,000 +
- Website: www.deestone.com

Deestone (Thai: ดีสโตน) is a Thai multinational tire manufacturer based in Om Noi, Samut Sakhon in central Thailand. It is the country’s largest Thai-owned tyre production facility. The company has five plants as well as subsidiaries in Samut Sakhon and Nakhon Pathom. In 2015, Deestone had a total investment around 10 billion baht with a production capacity of more than 10 million units/year. Deestone has 10,000 employees and 600 dealers throughout Thailand, and exports to for more than 120 countries worldwide. The company also makes motorcycle, truck, bicycle, and agricultural tyres.

== History ==
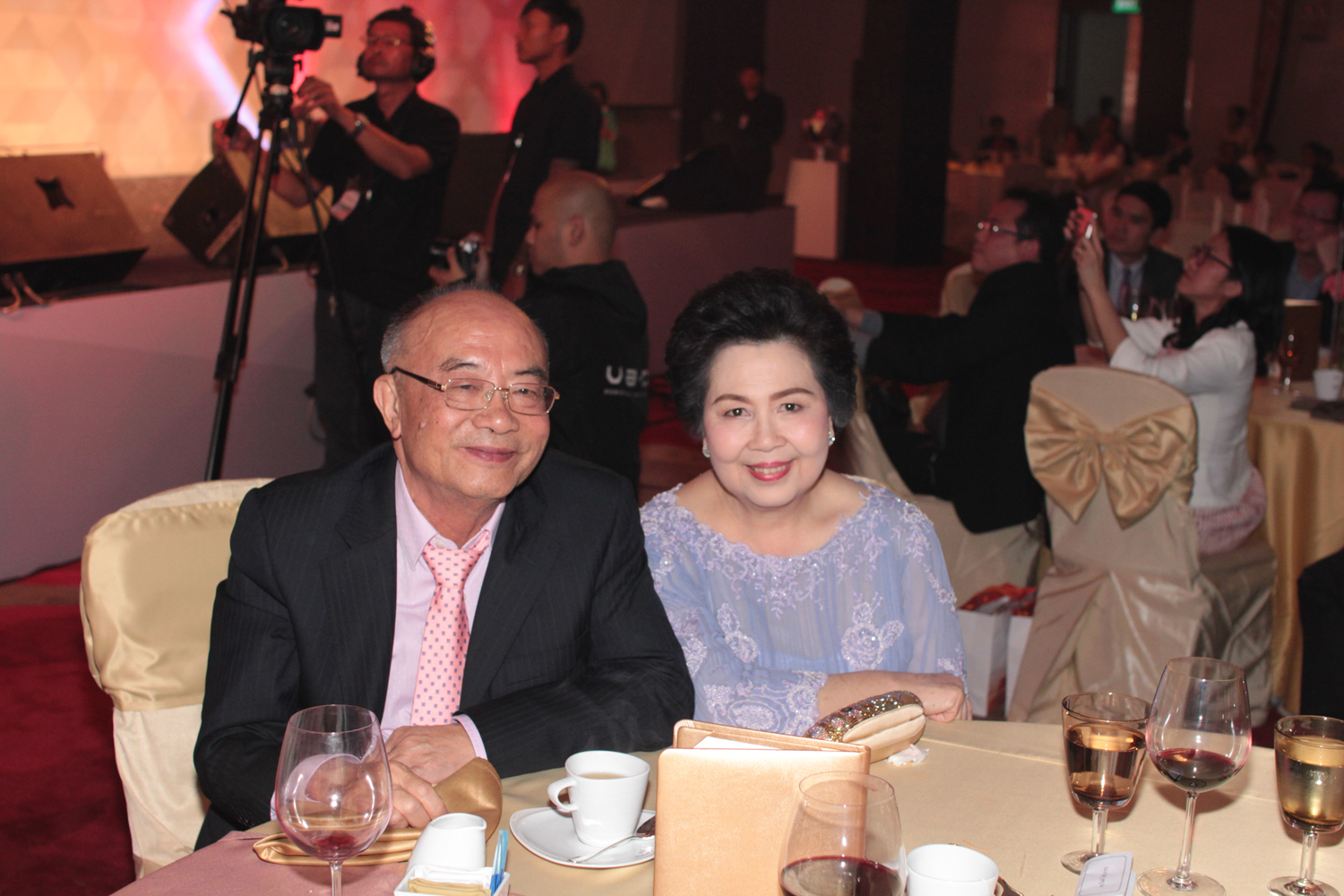
Suvit Vongsariyavanich (left), Founder of Deestone Group

Deestone was established by Suvit Vongsariyavanich in 1977, and its first two factories began by producing truck, Industrial and motorcycle tyres.

In 1994, with the establishment of its third factory, Deestone International Co., Ltd., the company diversified into bicycle, scooter and special industrial tyres, as well as inner tubes for export.

Deestone announced its first automobile radial tyre factory, Svizz-One Corporation Co., Ltd (Fourth Factory) in 2007.

In 2014, Deestone commenced operation of its fifth plant called Siam Truck Radial Co., Ltd, making truck radial tyres in Kamphaeng Saen, Nakhon Pathom.

== Products ==
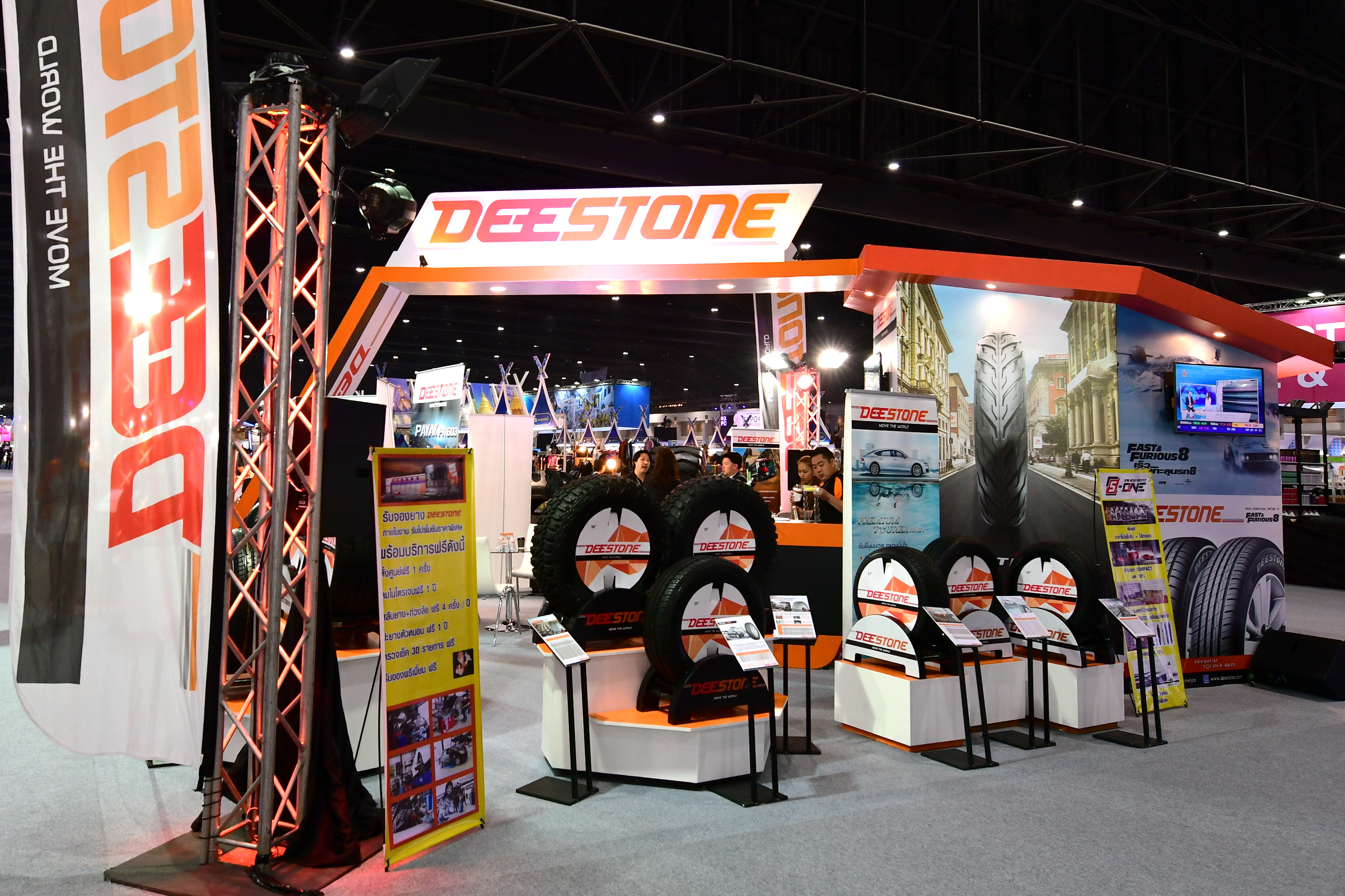
Deestone Tyres in Thailand Industry Expo 2017

- Motorcycle Tyres
- Bicycle Tyres
- Commercial vehicle Tyres (Radial)
- Truck bias Tyres
- Agricultural Tyres
- Radial Tyres
- Forklift Tyres
- OTR Tyres
- Tube and Flaps

== Brands ==
- 1. Deestone
- 2. Thunderer

== Sponsorship ==
In 2016, Deestone was the sponsorship of Thai League 1 club, Nakhon Ratchasima F.C. and Thai League 2 club, Nakhon Pathom United F.C.

== Promotion partner ==
In 2015 and 2017, Deestone was the promotion partner of Furious 7 and Furious 8, the seventh and eighth installment in The Fast and the Furious film franchise.

== List of Deestone Factories ==
- 1. Deestone Co., Ltd
- 2. Deerubber Co., Ltd
- 3. Deestone International Co., Ltd
- 4. Svizz-one Corporation Co., Ltd
- 5. Siam Truck Radial Co., Ltd

== See also ==
- List of companies of Thailand
- List of tire companies
