= Taner Öcal =

Turkish football manager

Personal information
- Date of birth: 26 March 1962 (age 64)
- Place of birth: Mardin, Turkey

Team information
- Current team: Nevşehirspor (manager)

Managerial career
- Years: Team
- 2005–2009: Hacettepe (youth)
- 2012: Ankaragücü
- 2013: Kahramanmaraşspor
- 2015–2016: Etimesgut Belediyespor
- 2016: Yeni Diyarbakırspor
- 2016: Hacettepe
- 2017: Düzcespor
- 2018–2019: Kardemir Karabükspor
- 2019: Kırşehirspor
- 2020–: Nevşehirspor

Taner Öcal (born 26 March 1962) is a Turkish football manager.
