= Laurette Koellner =

Former President of Boeing International

Laurette T. Koellner
- Citizenship: United States
- Education: MBA
- Alma mater: University of Central Florida, Stetson University
- Spouse: Victor Koellner
- Children: Stacy-Anne

Laurette T. Koellner is an American business executive. She serves on several corporate boards. From 2006 to 2008, she was president of Boeing International; before that, she was senior vice president and a member of the office of the chairman at the company.

== Early life and education ==
Koellner was raised in Brooklyn, and attended college at the University of Central Florida (UCF). She earned a Bachelor of Science degree in Business Management from UCF in 1977, and an MBA from Stetson University in 1980.

== Career ==
=== McDonnell Douglas/Boeing ===
After earning her bachelor's degree in 1977, Koellner began work at McDonnell Douglas as a contract analyst. She spent 19 years at McDonnell Douglas, with an end position of vice president of Internal Audit. After the Boeing-McDonnell Douglas merger in 1997, she remained with Boeing, first as vice president and general auditor, before being named vice president and corporate controller in 1999. In 2000, she was named the senior vice president of the Shared Services group. From 2002-2004, she served as a member of the office of the chairman, as well as the company's chief administration and human resources officer (a position she held until 2004). In 2004, Koellner was named the president of Connexion by Boeing, a position she held until 2006, when she was named the president of Boeing International. She remained in this position until her retirement from Boeing in 2008.

=== ILFC ===
In 2012, she was named executive chairman at the International Lease Finance Corporation (ILFC), a subsidiary of AIG. The newly created position made her the company's most senior executive, overseeing ILFC CEO Henri Courpron. She stepped down from AIG’s board of directors to take on the role, and in December 2012 announced she would depart once AIG's planned sale of the unit was approved. The sale to AerCap was completed in May 2014.

=== Board positions ===
In 2003, she was elected to the board of directors of Sara Lee Corporation as the chairman of the audit committee. When Sara Lee split into Hillshire Brands and Douwe Egberts, she maintained her board position until Hillshire merged with Tyson Foods.

In 2009, she joined the board of directors at Celestica, Inc. and was chair of the audit committee until she retired in 2025. In 2009, she was also named an independent director of American International Group (AIG). She remained in this position through AIG's repayment of its $182.5 billion in government loans. In 2014 she was elected to the Papa John's board of directors, and in 2015 she joined the Goodyear board. She was named lead director for Goodyear in 2019 and non-executive chairman in 2024. In September 2015, she joined the board of directors of the steel company Nucor.

== Advisory positions ==
Koellner serves on the Dean's Advisory Board of the UCF College of Business Administration, and has also served on the Board of Regents for the University of Portland. She is also a member of the Council on Foreign Relations and a board member for the University of Central Florida Foundation.

== Recognition ==
- 2003: UCF College of Business Administration Hall of Fame
- 2005: Distinguished Alumnus Award from UCF.
- 2011: Distinguished Alumni Award from Stetson University.
- "Audit committee financial expert" by the New York Stock Exchange.
- 2014: Featured as the highest-ranking female in the history of the company in the book Trailblazers: The Women of The Boeing Company
