= Galten, Denmark =

Galten
- Town and urban area
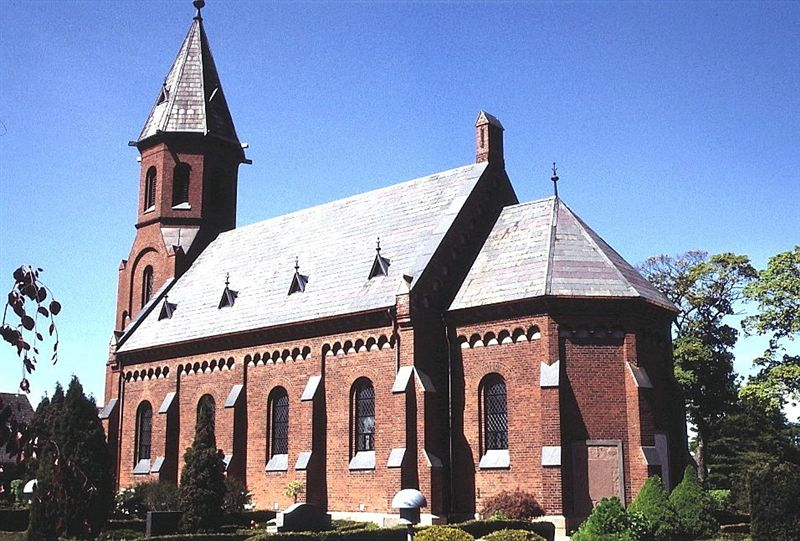
- Galten church

- Location in Denmark Galten (Central Denmark Region)
- Coordinates: 56°09′12″N 9°54′25″E
- Country: Denmark
- Region: Region Midtjylland
- Municipality: Skanderborg

Area
  - Urban: 6.2 km^{2} (2.4 sq mi)

Population (2026)
  - Urban: 9,442
  - Urban density: 1,500/km^{2} (3,900/sq mi)
  - Gender: 4,675 males and 4,767 females
- Time zone: UTC+1 (CET)
  - Summer (DST): UTC+2 (CEST)
- Postal code: DK-8464 Galten

Galten is a former railway town in central Denmark, at the Aarhus-Hammel-Thorsø railroad which was closed in 1956. The town is located in Skanderborg Municipality, Region Midtjylland, Jutland – about 17 kilometres (11 miles) – west of Aarhus and is now more or less a satellite town of Aarhus. Today, Galten has almost fused with the neighbouring eastern town of Skovby into an urban area with a population of 9,442 (1 January 2026).

To the west of the town of Galten, there are beautiful landscapes. The scenery between Galten and the nearby lakeside town of Ry is characterised by the gently rolling hilly landscape, that is so characteristic of eastern Jutland.

Galten is home to the STARCO Europe A/S, a global group for specialty tire and wheel engineering and manufacturing, and furniture maker Skovby Møbelfabrik.

In 2022, Galten became twin city with the German city Würzburg located in Franconia. A small wine shop exists in Galten selling only Franconian wines.

There is a movement to have a stop in Galten on the new Aarhus-Silkeborg railway line.

== Notable people ==
- Claus Olesen (born 1974 in Galten) a retired Danish sailor, competed in the 2004 and the 2012 Summer Olympics.
- Trine Østergaard (born 1991 in Galten) a Danish handball player for Odense Håndbold and the Danish national team.
- Anne Mette Pedersen (born 1992 in Galten) a Danish handball player for FC Midtjylland Håndbold and the Danish national team.
- Thomas T. Kristensen (born 2002 in Galten) a Danish football player for Udinese Calcio and previously the Danish Youth National teams U/18, U/19, U/20 and U/21.
