= Petlas =

Turkish tyre manufacturing company

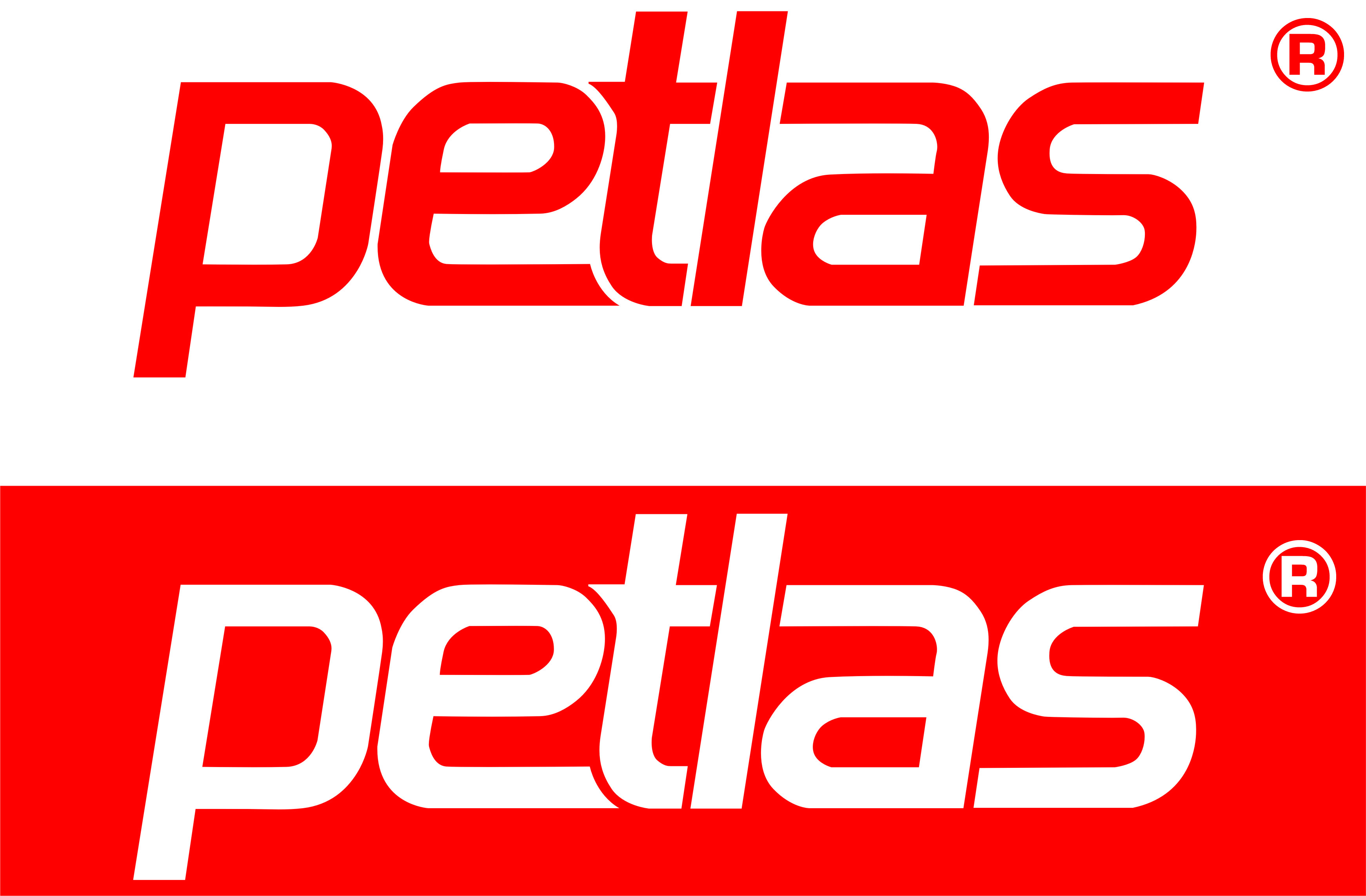
- Company type: Subsidiary of AKO Grup
- Industry: Tyres
- Founded: 18 August 1976; 48 years ago
- Headquarters: Kırşehir, Turkey
- Parent: AKO Group
- Website: petlas.com

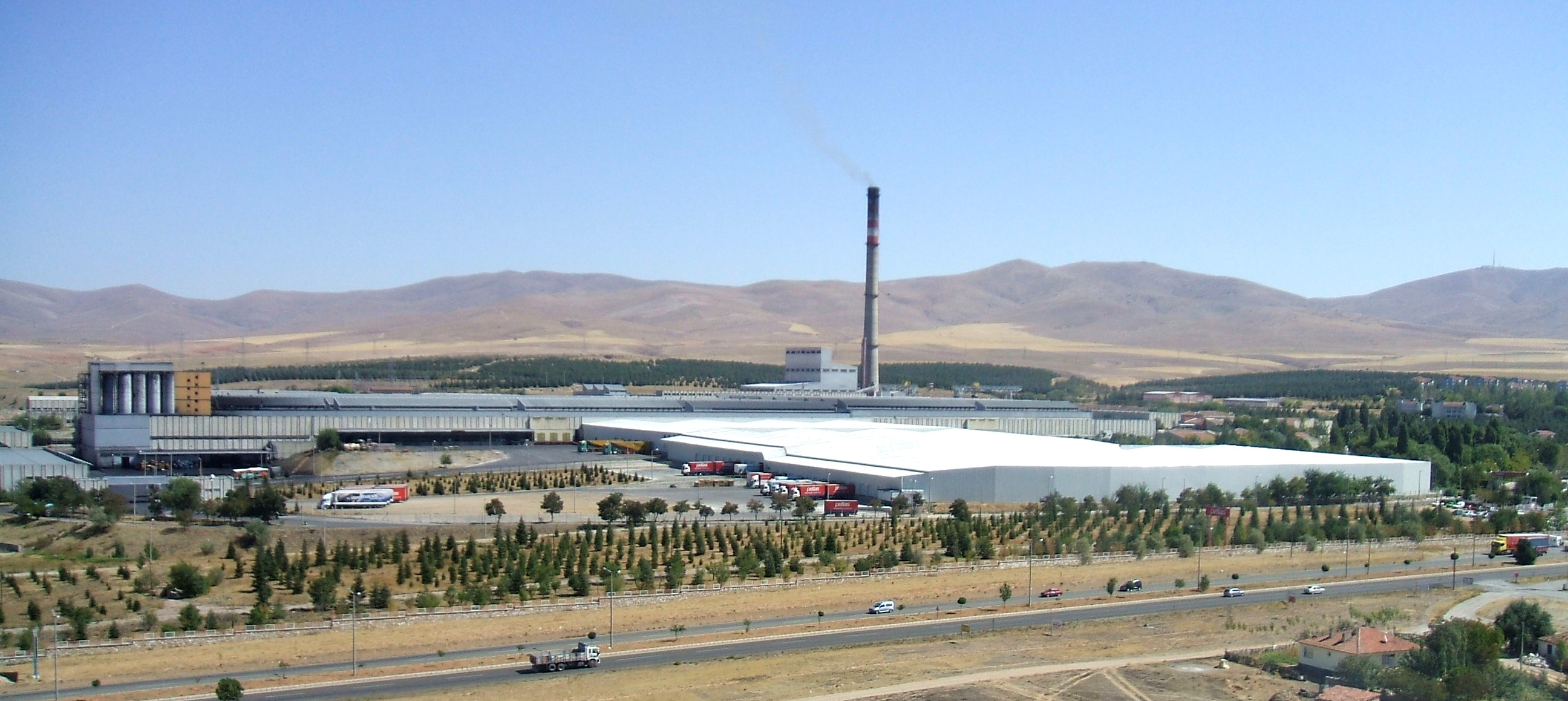
Petlas factory

Petlas is a Turkish tyre manufacturing company, founded in 1976.

Its main markets are agricultural, commercial, and military tyres. Military market was its initial market focus in the first two decades of operation.

However, since the mid-2000s, the company is also producing a wide range of tyres for passenger cars. Since the early 2010s, the company also produces HT, AT and MT class tyres for all-terrain 4WD vehicles. The company runs a small coal-fired power station.
