= STARCO =

Danish tire and wheel company

STARCO Europe
- Industry: Manufacturing and service
- Founded: 1962; 64 years ago
- Founder: Poul Henrik Julius Ejlersgaard
- Headquarters: Galten, Denmark
- Key people: Peer Ejlersgaard (1959-2016), Owner, CEO (1992-2014), Chairman (2014-2016); (former) Carl Evald Bakke-Jacobsen, Chairman; Richard Todd, CEO
- Products: Industrial solid tires, wheels, rims, dual wheels
- Number of employees: 600+ (2016)
- Website: www.starco.com

STARCO is a Danish-run tire and wheel business. The company supply to original equipment manufacturers (OEMs) and distributors; and manufactures steel wheels and plastic rims and tires. The name "STARCO" is an acronym of "Scandinavian Tyre and Rim Company".

It was established in Aarhus, Denmark in 1962, and was owned and operated by Ejlersgaard family. In 2017 the STARCO Group was acquired by the tire manufacturer Kenda.

The company is headquartered in Brabrand, Aarhus, Denmark. The company produces solid tires, steel wheel rims, dual wheels, and flex barrow wheels.

== History ==
In 1961, the company was established as P. Ejlersgaard A/S in Aarhus, Denmark. STARCO Europe was established in 1990. In the next decade, STARCO acquired tire and wheel companies in the Netherlands, Germany, Sweden and Great Britain. In 2001 the company expanded into Latvia, Lithuania, Estonia and Poland, and in 2002 into Russia. In 2002, the company's production of rims for agricultural machines also moved from Great Britain to Croatia. In 2004, tire and wheel companies in Belgium were acquired by the company. In 2005, STARCO S.R.L. was established in Italy. The same year, STARCO Europe bought into a British company, and together the new group became known as STARCO DML Ltd. In 2006, the company expanded into Belarus and Ukraine.

STARCO Group acquired manufacturer Gebr. Schaad AG in 2007. It opened a solid tire manufacturing plant in Sri Lanka in 2011. In 2012, the company opened a new central warehouse is open in Winsen, Germany and began implementing e-coat nanotechnology treatment during steel wheel production. The following year, STARCO ZA was formed as a bridgehead for further expansion on the African continent. Also in 2013, Gebrüder Schaad became STARCO GS. STARCO chairman and owner Peer Ejlersgaard died in 2016. The company was acquired by Kenda Tire in 2017.

== Production capacity ==
- Number of markets (countries): 22
- Number of sales entities: 28
- Number of production sites: 5
- Strategic OEM assembly centers: 6
- Strategic central warehouses: 4

== Production facilities ==
- STARCO Huanmei (2008)
- STARCO Beli Manastir d.o.o. (2002)
- STARCO DML Ltd. (2005)
- STARCO Lanka (PVT) Ltd. (2011)
- STARCO GS (1982)
