= Goodyear Tire and Rubber Company =

American multinational tire manufacturer

The Goodyear Tire & Rubber Company
- Logo used since 2025

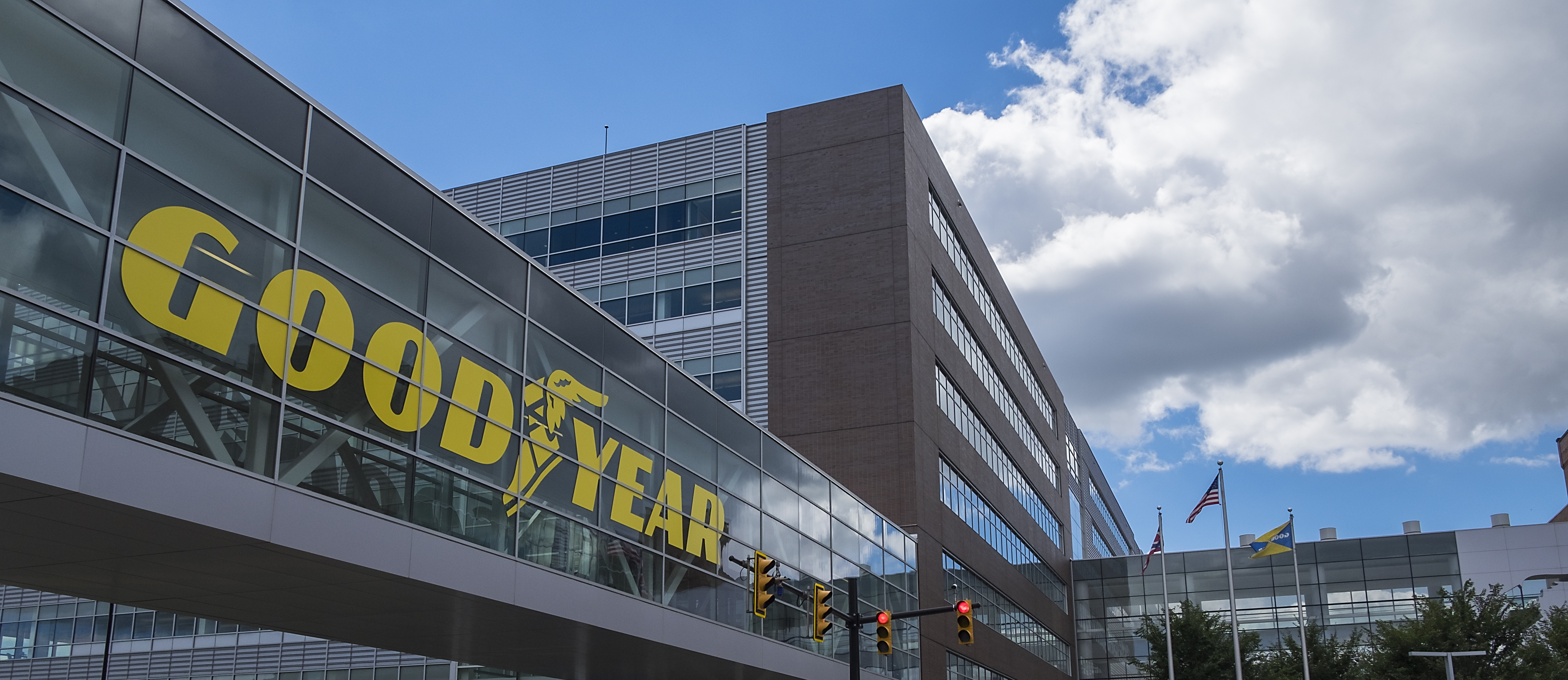
- The company's headquarters in Akron, Ohio
- Type: Public
- Traded as: Nasdaq: GT; S&P 600 component; NYSE: GT (1927–2012)
- Industry: Manufacturing
- Founded: August 29, 1898; 128 years ago in Akron, Ohio, U.S.
- Founder: Frank Seiberling
- Headquarters: Akron, Ohio, U.S.
- Number of locations: 1,240 tire and auto service centers 57 facilities
- Area served: Worldwide
- Key people: Roger Wood (Interim CEO)
- Products: Tires
- Revenue: ▼US$18.88 billion (2024)
- Operating income: ▲US$709 million (2024)
- Net income: ▲US$70 million (2024)
- Total assets: ▼US$20.96 billion (2024)
- Total equity: ▲US$4.906 billion (2024)
- Number of employees: 68,000 (2024)
- Subsidiaries: List of subsidiaries
- Website: goodyear.com

The Goodyear Tire & Rubber Company, commonly known as Goodyear, is an American multinational tire manufacturer headquartered in Akron, Ohio. It develops tires for automobiles, motorcycles, trucks, recreational vehicles, heavy off-road machinery, aviation and military. It also licenses the Goodyear brand to bicycle tire manufacturers, returning from a break in production between 1976 and 2015.

Founded in 1898 by Frank Seiberling, the company was named after American Charles Goodyear (1800–1860), inventor of vulcanized rubber. The first Goodyear tires became popular because they were easily detachable and required little maintenance. Goodyear was a component of the Dow Jones Industrial Average between 1930 and 1999. Since 2021, the company has been the world's third-largest tire manufacturer by annual revenue. It was the first foreign tire manufacturer to enter China when it invested in a plant in Dalian in 1994.

The company is a major tire supplier for auto racing, including NASCAR, NHRA and sports car racing. Previously it also competed in Formula One and Indianapolis 500. Though Goodyear had been manufacturing airships and balloons since the early 1900s, the first Goodyear advertising blimp flew in 1925. Today, it is one of the most recognizable advertising icons in the country.

== Retail history ==
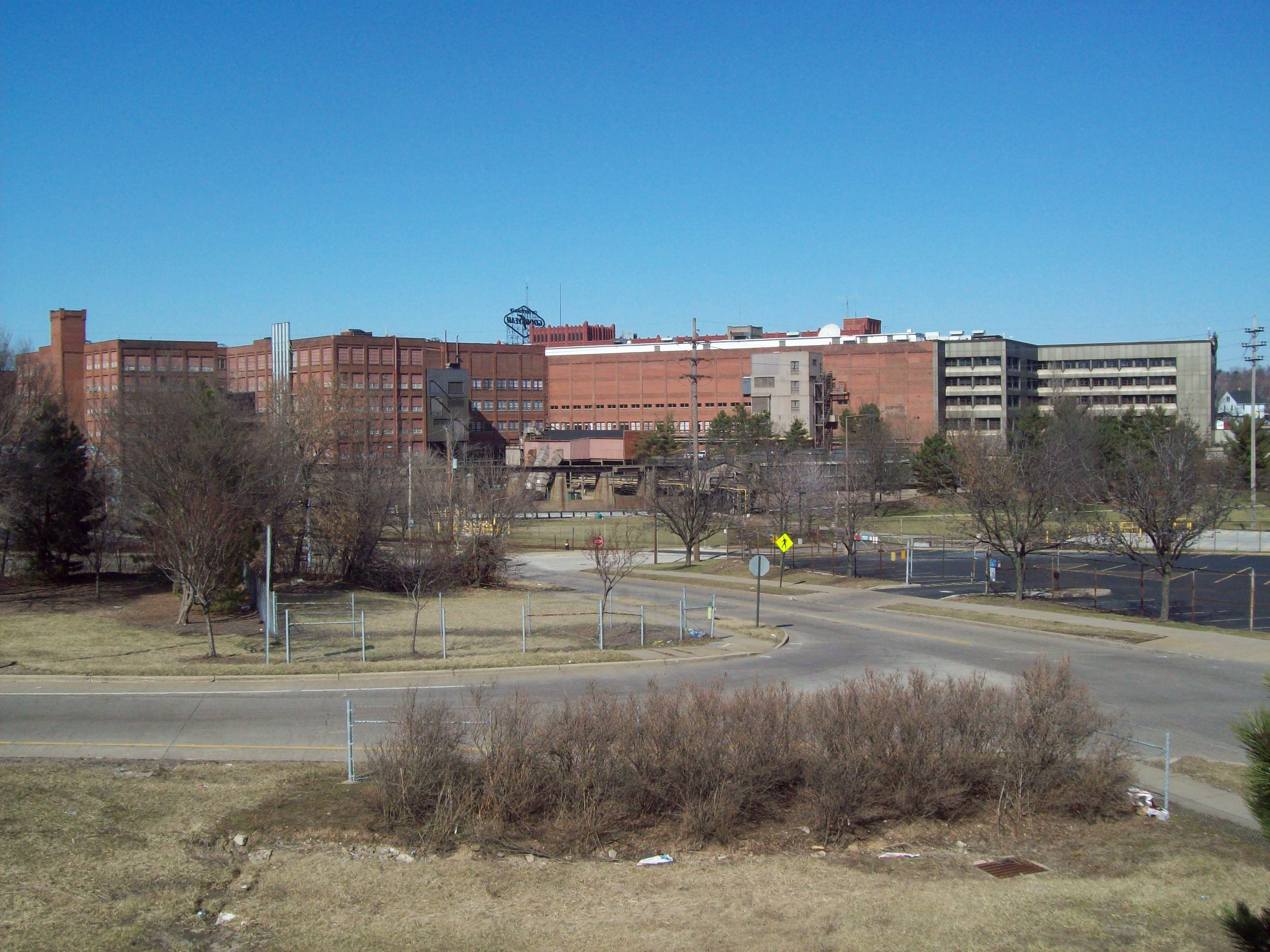
Goodyear factory buildings and old former headquarters complex

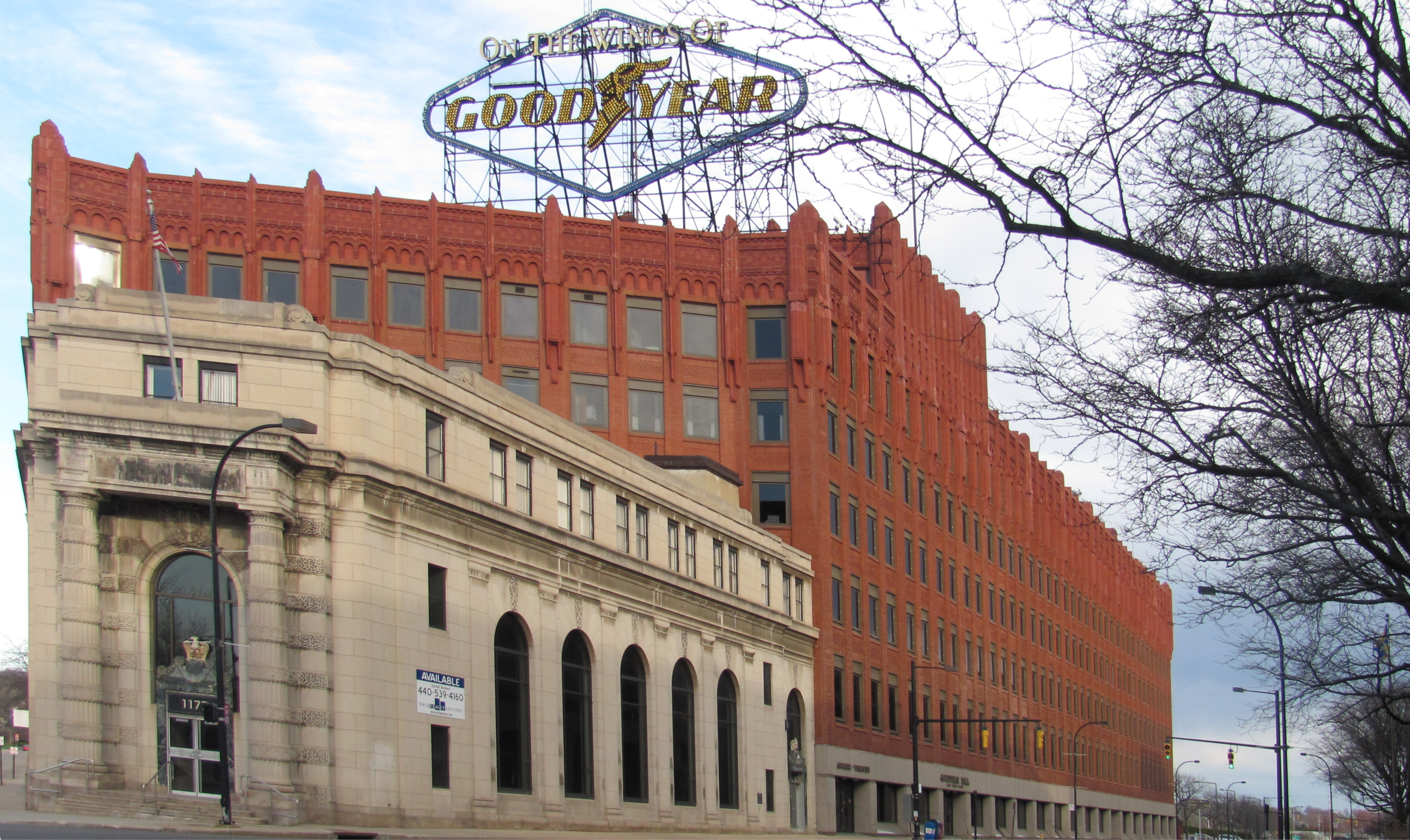
The original Goodyear headquarters in Akron.

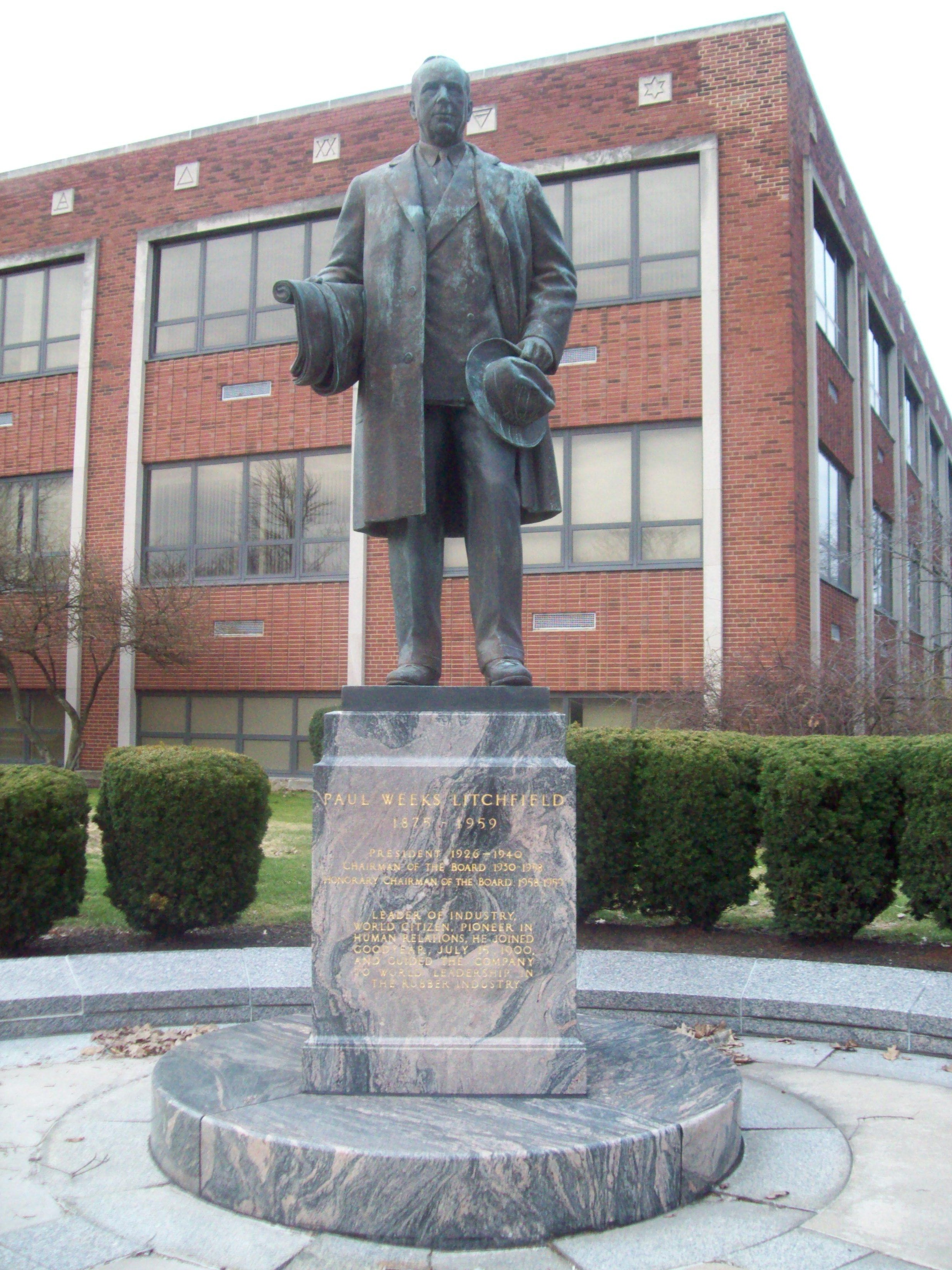
Paul Litchfield, inventor of the tubeless car tire who promoted the Zeppelin partnership and later became Goodyear president and board chairman.

=== Early history: 1898–1926 ===
The first Goodyear factory opened in Akron, Ohio, in 1898. The company originally manufactured bicycle and carriage tires, rubber horseshoe pads, and poker chips, and grew with the advent of the automobile.

In 1901, Goodyear founder Frank Seiberling provided Henry Ford with racing tires. In 1903, Goodyear president, chairman and CEO Paul Weeks Litchfield was granted a patent for the first tubeless automobile tire. In 1910, the company purchased an existing rubber factory in Bowmanville, Ontario, in Canada, which expanded their manufacturing outside of the United States for the first time.

In 1916, Litchfield found land in the Phoenix area suitable for growing long-staple cotton, which was needed to reinforce its rubber in tires. The 36,000 acres purchased were controlled by the Southwest Cotton Company, formed with Litchfield as president. (This included land that would develop into the towns of Goodyear and Litchfield Park.)

In late 1919, the United States, influenced by the Goodyear Tire and Rubber Company, organised the creation of a "coal and steel state" under international protection which included the Upper Silesian Industrial Circle and the Ostrava–Karviná basin in the former Austrian Silesia. Because of opposition from France, the United States withdrew from supporting a Silesian state. This period was marked by tensions leading up to the 1921 Upper Silesia plebiscite.

In 1924, Litchfield forged a joint venture with the German Luftschiffbau Zeppelin Company to form the Goodyear-Zeppelin Corporation. From the late 1920s to 1940, the company worked with Goodyear to build two Zeppelins in the United States. The partnership continued even when Zeppelin was under Nazi control and only ended after World War II began.

=== Expansion: 1926–1970 ===
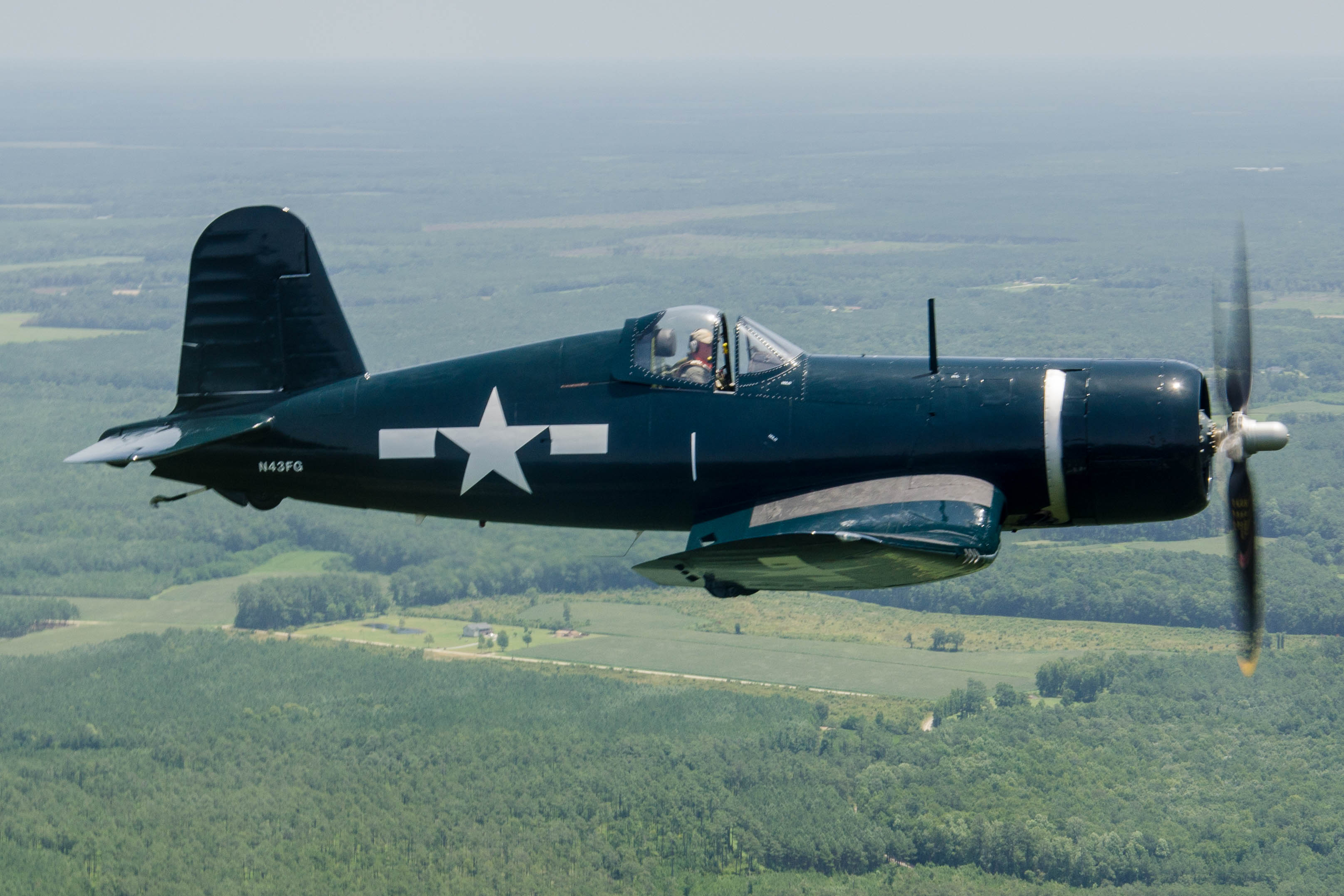
During World War II, Goodyear manufactured the F4U Corsair fighter plane.

On August 5, 1927, Goodyear had its initial public offering and was listed on the New York Stock Exchange.

By 1930, Goodyear had pioneered what would later become known as "tundra tires" for smaller aircraft—their so-called low inflation pressure "airwheel" aviation wheel-rim/tire sets were initially available in sizes up to 46 inches (117 cm) in diameter.

Over the next few decades, Goodyear grew to become a multinational corporation. It acquired their rival Kelly-Springfield Tire in 1935. During World War II Goodyear manufactured F4U Corsair fighter planes for the U.S. Military. Goodyear ranked 30th among United States corporations in the value of wartime production contracts. WWII forced the dissolution of the Goodyear-Zeppelin partnership in December 1940. By 1956 they owned and operated a nuclear processing plant in Ohio.

In 1944, Goodyear created a subsidiary in Mexico in a joint venture with Compañía Hulera, S.A. de C.V., Compañía Hulera Goodyear-Oxo, S.A. de C.V. or Goodyear-Oxo.

Goodyear opened a factory in Lurgan, Northern Ireland in 1967 to manufacture hoses, fan belts, conveyor belts, and other rubber products. It was immediately lauded as "Craigavon's industrial revolution" for providing critical employment in the area. A football team known as Goodyear F.C. is still currently active in the Mid-Ulster Football League despite the factory closing down in 1983. It was established by laborers of the Goodyear factory. They play in Goodyear's blue and yellow colours, and their badge is the Goodyear logo.

=== Radial tire transition ===
Goodyear is the only one of the five biggest tire firms among US tire manufacturers in 1970 to remain independent into the 21st century. Goodyear's success was partly due to the challenge posed by radial tire technology, and the varied responses. At the time, the entire US tire industry produced the older bias-ply technology. Estimates to fit factories with new machinery and tools for making the new product were between $600 million and $900 million. This was a substantial amount in a low margin business with sales revenue in the low billions. The US market was slowly shifting towards the radial tire, as had already been the case in Europe and Asia. In 1968, Consumer Reports, an influential American magazine, acknowledged the superiority of radial construction, which had been developed in 1946 by Michelin.

When Charles J. Pilliod Jr. became CEO in 1974, he faced a major investment decision regarding the radial tire, which today has a market share of nearly 100%. Despite heavy criticism at the time, Pilliod invested heavily in new factories and tooling to build the radial tire. Sam Gibara, who headed Goodyear from 1996 to 2003, has noted that without the action of Pilliod, Goodyear "wouldn't be around today."

Sales for 1969 topped $3 billion. Five years later sales topped $5 billion and Goodyear operated in 34 countries. In 1978, the original Akron plant was converted into a Technical Center for research and design. By 1985, worldwide sales exceeded $10 billion.

Goodyear Aerospace, a holding that developed from the Goodyear Aircraft Company after World War II, designed a supercomputer for NASA's Goddard Spaceflight Center in 1979, the MPP. The subsidiary was sold in 1987 to the Loral Corporation as a result of restructuring.

In 1987, Goodyear formed a business partnership with Canadian tire retailer Fountain Tire.

=== Diversification and Goldsmith affair 1986 ===
In the 1980s, incoming Goodyear CEO Robert E. Mercer argued that the tire and automobile-related businesses that formed the core of Goodyear to that date were slow growing and a handicap. He set a strategy "to get away from the cyclical nature of the automobile business through mergers or purchase of businesses unrelated to tires or vehicles."

In 1983, Goodyear acquired the natural gas company Celeron Corporation in exchange for stock valued at more than $740 million. It went on to invest heavily in gas exploration including the 1,200 mile crude oil "All American" pipeline from California to Texas. The project was initially estimated to cost $600 million but ultimately cost almost $1 billion.

In October 1986 British financier James Goldsmith in conjunction with the investment group Hanson purchased 11.5% of Goodyear's outstanding common stock. This was viewed as a greenmail attack by some, and as shareholder activism by Goldsmith, who viewed the company's move into areas far removed from tire development production and sale as commercially ill-advised and wanted the company to divest, especially, its oil interests which he viewed as depressing the value of the company.

On November 20, 1986, Goodyear acquired all of the stock held by Goldsmith's group (12,549,400 shares) at an above-market price of $49.50 per share. Goodyear also made a tender offer for up to 40 million shares of its stock from other shareholders at $50 per share. The tender offer resulted in Goodyear buying 40,435,764 shares of stock in February 1987.

As a result of the stock buyback, Goodyear took a charge of $224.6 million associated with a massive restructuring plan. It sold its Goodyear Aerospace business to Loral Corporation for $588 million and its motor wheel business to Lemmerz Inc. for $175 million. Two subsidiaries involved in agricultural products, real estate development, and a resort hotel in Arizona were sold for $220.1 million. The company also sold the Celeron gas and oil corporation. In 1998, the All American Pipeline, Celeron Gathering, and Celeron Trading and Transportation were sold, largely completing what Goldsmith's hostile takeover had suggested good management should do. In the years following 1987, the company invested in its tire business. President Tom Barrett succeeded Chairman Robert Mercer in 1989, and began a process of modernizing and expanding Goodyear plants in cities like Lawton, Oklahoma, Napanee, Canada, Point Pleasant, West Virginia, and Scottsboro, Alabama. In the 2000s, the move of business into low-wage countries, facilitated by GATT (which Goldsmith had warned government against, calling it "a policy to impoverish"), resulted in plants across North America being shuttered, for instance Cumberland, Maryland; New Toronto, Ontario, Canada, and Windsor, Vermont were closed.

=== 1990 to present ===
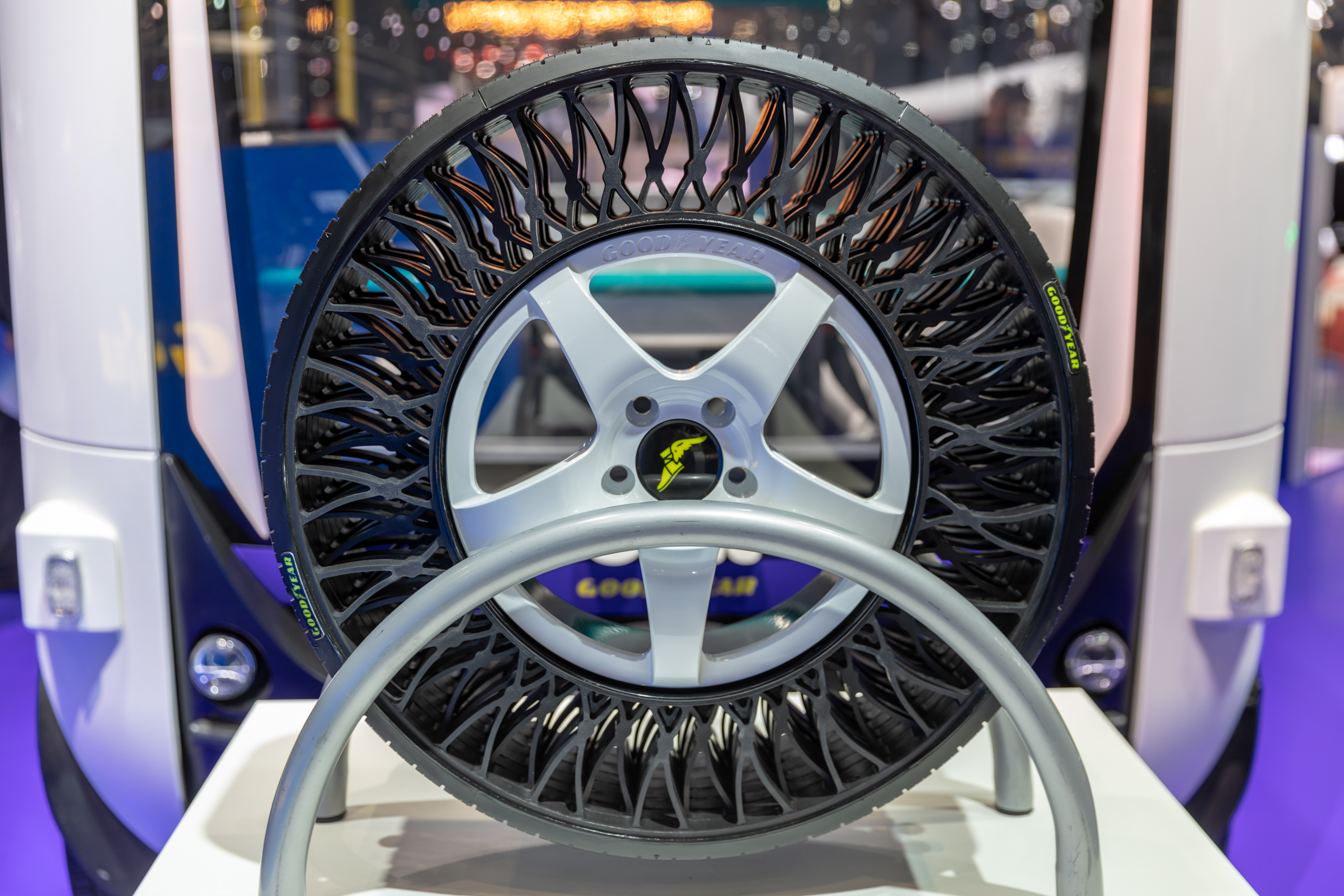
Airless tire concept

The last major restructuring of the company took place in 1991. Goodyear hired Stanley Gault, former CEO of Rubbermaid, to expand the company into new markets. The moves resulted in 12,000 employees being laid off.

In 2005, Titan Tire purchased the farm tire business of Goodyear, and manufactures Goodyear agricultural tires under license. This acquisition included the plant in Freeport, Illinois.

In the summer of 2009, the company announced it would close its tire plant in the Philippines as part of a strategy to address uncompetitive manufacturing capacity globally by the end of the third quarter of that year.

Goodyear announced plans to sell the assets of its Latin American off-road tire business to Titan Tire for $98.6 million, including the plant in São Paulo, Brazil and a licensing agreement that allows Titan to continue manufacturing under the Goodyear brand. This deal is similar to Titan's 2005 purchase of Goodyear's US farm tire assets.

In 2011, more than 70 years after the dissolution of the Goodyear-Zeppelin Corporation, it is announced that Goodyear would partner with Zeppelin again (the legacy company Zeppelin Luftschifftechnik) to build more zeppelins together.

In 2018, Goodyear and Bridgestone announced the creation of TireHub, a joint wholesale distribution network across the United States. At the same time, Goodyear also announced that it was ending its distribution relationship with American Tire Distributors, which is the largest tire wholesaler in the country.

In 2018, Goodyear was ordered to pay $40.1 million to J. Walter Twidwell, who claimed he developed mesothelioma because of exposure to asbestos. After the trial, Goodyear asked the New York Supreme Court for a new trial. Goodyear attorney James Lynch said Goodyear did not receive proper consideration from the jury. Lynch said that the other side's attorneys engaged in character assassinations against expert witnesses. During closing remarks, the attorneys for Twidwell put up a slide with the heads of Goodyear's expert witnesses pasted onto "insulting caricatures."

In December 2018, Goodyear ceased operations in Venezuela due a lack of materials and rising costs resulting from hyperinflation.

In February 2021, Goodyear announced that it would acquire the Cooper Tire & Rubber Company for $2.5 billion. The transaction closed in the second half of 2021.

In July 2024, Goodyear announced the sale of its off-the-road tire business to Yokohama Rubber Company for $905 million.

In January 2025, the firm announced the sale of the Dunlop brand to Sumitomo Rubber Industries for $701 million.

In May 2026, Goodyear was reported to shutdown its plant in Fayetteville, North Carolina.

=== Timeline ===
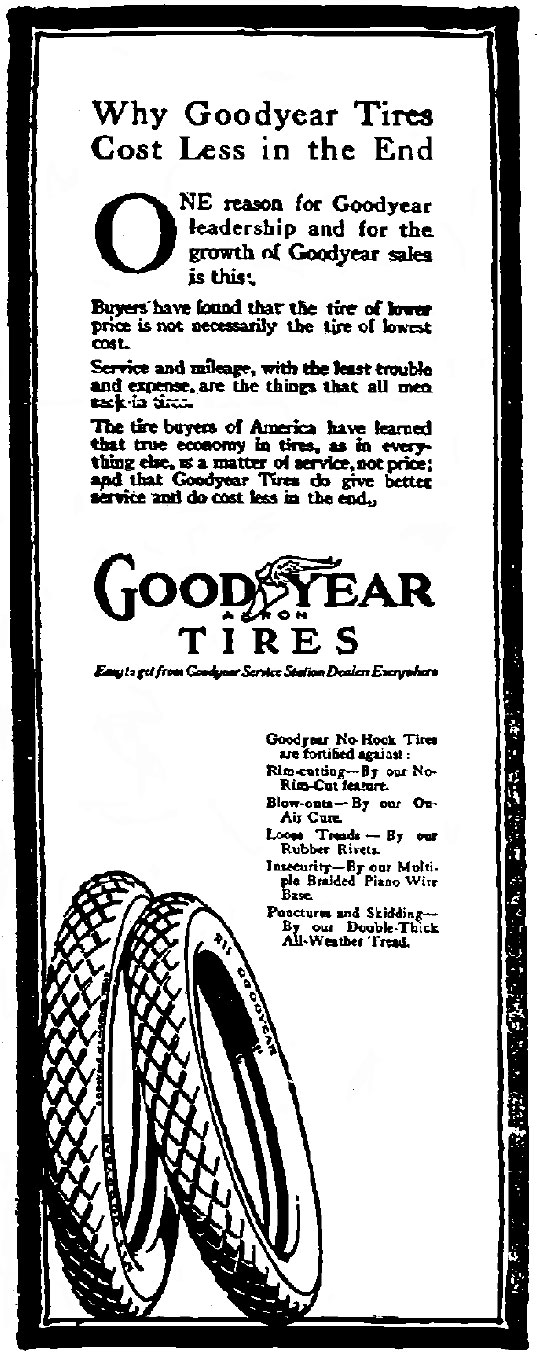
Goodyear Tires advertisement, Syracuse Post-Standard, February 26, 1916

- 1898: Goodyear founded
- 1899: Automobile tires added to the original product line of bicycle tires, carriage tires and horseshoe pads
- 1901: Seiberling makes racing tires for Henry Ford
- 1903: Paul Litchfield granted patent on first tubeless automobile tire (Litchfield would go on to become president of Goodyear-Zeppelin, then board chairman)
- 1908: Ford's Model T is outfitted with Goodyear tires
- 1909: First pneumatic aircraft tire
- 1911: First airship envelope
- 1912: Goodyear blimp first debuts
- 1917: Made airships and balloons for the U.S. military during World War I
- 1919: Tires on the winning car at the Indianapolis 500
- 1924: Zeppelin patents acquired, joint venture Goodyear-Zeppelin Corporation formed with the German company
- 1925: Pilgrim is launched, the first commercial non-rigid airship to use helium
- 1926: World's largest rubber company, based on sales of $230,161,356
- 1927: Initial public offering
- 1929: Construction of world's largest airship dock started in Akron
- 1929: Introduction of first-known example of low-pressure tundra tires for aviation, invented by Alvin J. Musselman as Goodyear "Airwheels"
- 1935: Acquired Kelly-Springfield Tire
- 1937: First American-made synthetic rubber tire
- 1940: In December, Goodyear-Zeppelin Corporation dissolved with WWII straining partnership
- 1942: Awarded contract to build FG-series Corsair naval fighter planes
- 1944: Tire testing begins near San Angelo, Texas
- 1947: First nylon tires developed
- 1949: First television advertising with sponsorship of "The Goodyear Review," hosted by Paul Whiteman
- 1954: First nationwide strike in company's history lasted 52 days
- 1956: Goodyear-operated U235 atomic processing plant opens in Ohio
- 1957: Goodyear Proving Grounds for tire testing, near San Angelo, Texas, is rebuilt
- 1958: Production of foam-padded instrument panels begun for 1959 model cars
- 1962: Goodyear racing tires used on more winning stock and sports cars than any other brand
- 1963: Goodyear produces its one billionth tire
- 1965: Radial-ply tires made available in a full range of sizes to auto manufacturers
- 1967: Goodyear introduces the Polyglas tire, one of the first wide-tread bias-belted fiberglass tires, which along with similar tires from competitors such as the Firestone Wide-Oval would become regular equipment on 1970 to 1974 models, which would be superseded by radial tires beginning in 1975.
- 1969: Sales reach $3 billion
- 1970: First tires on the moon (Apollo 14)
- 1974: Sales reach $5 billion
- 1975: All tires used in Indianapolis 500 supplied by Goodyear
- 1976: Chemical Division shipped first shatterproof polyester resin bottles
- 1977: Industry's first all-season tire (Tiempo) introduced
- 1978: Akron plant converted into Technical Center for R&D
- 1983: Three billionth tire produced
- 1984: Worldwide sales exceed $10 billion
- 1986: James Goldsmith takeover attempt and resulting restructuring
- 1987: Completion of the California–Texas "All American" oil pipeline
- 1991: Aquatred tire introduced
- 1992: Began selling tires at Sears stores
- 1993: Opened first tire store in Beijing, China
- 1993: Inauguration of Dalian plant, China
- 1994: "electronic store" opened on CompuServe
- 1995: Worldwide sales exceed $13 billion
- 1995: Bought Polish Tire Company Dębica
- 1998: Sold the All American Pipeline and Celeron businesses
- 1999: Announced $1 billion global alliance with Japan's Sumitomo Rubber Industries, which had rights to the Dunlop Tires brand in much of the world, to establish six joint ventures in North America, Europe and Japan
- 2000: Formed an Internet-based purchasing alliance with five other rubber companies called RubberNetwork.com
- 2003: Quarterly dividend to shareholders eliminated
- 2004: Assurance TripleTred and ComforTred tires introduced
- 2005: North American farm tire operations sold to Titan Tire Corporation
- 2006: Goodyear blimp made maiden voyage in China
- 2007: Engineered Products Division sold to Carlyle Group; EPD is renamed Veyance Technologies
- 2008: Voluntary Employees' Beneficiary Association trust (VEBA) approved by U.S. District Court, funded with $1 billion
- 2009: Goodyear Assurance Fuel Max tire introduced in North America
- 2010: Plans announced to sell European and Latin American farm tire businesses
- 2011: After being dissolved during WWII, Goodyear and Zeppelin's legacy company partner again to build more airships together
- 2013: New headquarters complex opens in Akron
- 2015: Goodyear and Sumitomo announced that they would dissolve their worldwide partnership.
- 2018: The company ranked 187th on the Fortune 500 list of the largest United States companies by revenue marking its 24th year on the list

== Corporate structure and leadership ==
=== Board of directors ===
Members of the board of directors as of November 2026

- Joseph R. Hinrichs (Chairman)
- Roger Wood (interim CEO).
- Norma B. Clayton.
- James A. Firestone.
- Julie M. Hamilton.
- Laurette T. Koellner.
- Karla R. Lewis.
- Max H. Mitchell.
- Hera Kitwan Siu.
- Michael R. Wessel.
- Jason J. Winkler.

Former Board members include Shirley D. Peterson, William J. Contay, James C. Boland and Rodney O'Neal. Mark Stewart was the chief executive officer and president of the company (2024 - 2026), succeeding Richard Kramer but decided to pursue a career outside of Goodyear on November 9, 2026. Acting as interim CEO is Roger Wood.

=== Subsidiaries and sub-brands ===
- Cooper Tire & Rubber Co.
- The Kelly Springfield Tire Company (United States)
- Douglas Tires
- Fierce
- Lee
- Sava (Slovenia)
- Fulda (Germany)
- Dębica (Poland)
- Wingfoot Commercial Tire Systems, LLC
- Bluestreak (Indonesia)
- Regetta (Australia) Distributed by KMART
- LS2000 (Japan) Distributed by Goodyear Autocare
- Goodyear Auto Service Centers
- Goodyear Chemical
- Just Tires
- Raben Tire

== Controversies ==
=== Foreign relations with Indonesia in the 1960s ===
Following the military coup in Indonesia in 1965, the Indonesian president Suharto encouraged Goodyear to return and offered rubber resources and political prisoners as labor. In an NBC special aired in 1967, reporter Ted Yates aired footage showing former Communist rubber union workers escorted at gunpoint to the rubber plantation.

Bad as things are in Indonesia, one positive fact is known. Indonesia has a fabulous potential wealth in natural resources and the New Order [the fascist regime headed by pro-U.S. General Suharto] wants it exploited. So they are returning the private properties expropriated by Sukarno's regime. Goodyear's Sumatran rubber empire is an example. It was seized [by the rubber workers] in retaliation for U.S. aggression in Vietnam in 1965. The rubber workers union was Communist-run, so after the coup many of them were killed or imprisoned. Some of the survivors, you see them here, still work the rubber – but this time as prisoners, and at gunpoint.

=== Pay discrimination lawsuits ===
United States Supreme Court Justice Ruth Bader Ginsburg stated,

Lilly Ledbetter was a supervisor at Goodyear Tire and Rubber's plant in Gadsden, Alabama, from 1979 until her retirement in 1998. For most of those years, she worked as an area manager, a position largely occupied by men. Initially, Ledbetter's salary was in line with the salaries of men performing substantially similar work. Over time, however, her pay slipped in comparison to the pay of male area managers with equal or less seniority. By the end of 1997, Ledbetter was the only woman working as an area manager and the pay discrepancy between Ledbetter and her 15 male counterparts was stark: Ledbetter was paid $3,727 per month; the lowest paid male area manager received $4,286 per month, the highest paid, $5,236.

Lilly Ledbetter sued Goodyear claiming she was paid less than men doing the same work. She won the suit and was awarded $360,000, the jury deciding that Goodyear had clearly engaged in discrimination. The case was appealed to the Supreme Court. In Ledbetter v. Goodyear Tire & Rubber Co., 550 U.S. 618 (2007), Justice Alito held for the five-justice majority that employers are protected from lawsuits over race or gender pay discrimination if the claims are based on decisions made by the employer 180 days ago or more. The United States Congress overturned this decision by passing the Lilly Ledbetter Fair Pay Act of 2009 which was the first bill signed into law by President Obama.

This was a case of statutory rather than constitutional interpretation. The plaintiff in this case, Lilly Ledbetter, characterized her situation as one where "disparate pay is received during the statutory limitations period, but is the result of intentionally discriminatory pay decisions that occurred outside the limitations period." In rejecting Ledbetter's appeal, the Supreme Court said that "she could have, and should have, sued" when the pay decisions were made, instead of waiting beyond the 180-day statutory charging period.

Justice Ginsburg dissented from the opinion of the court, joined by Justices Stevens, Souter, and Breyer. She argued against applying the 180-day limit to pay discrimination, because discrimination often occurs in small increments over large periods of time. Furthermore, the pay information of fellow workers is typically confidential and unavailable for comparison. Ginsburg argued that pay discrimination is inherently different from adverse actions, such as termination. Adverse actions are obvious, but small pay discrepancy is often difficult to recognize until more than 180 days of the pay change. Ginsburg argued that the broad remedial purpose of the statute was incompatible with the court's "cramped" interpretation. Her dissent asserted that the employer had been, "Knowingly carrying past pay discrimination forward" during the 180-day charging period, and therefore could be held liable.

=== Environmental record ===
Researchers at the University of Massachusetts Amherst identified Goodyear as the 19th-largest corporate producer of air pollution in the United States, with roughly 4.16 million lbs of toxins released into the air annually. Major pollutants included sulfuric acid, cobalt compounds, and chlorine. The Center for Public Integrity reports that Goodyear has been named as a potentially responsible party in at least 54 of the nation's Superfund toxic waste sites. On February 8, 2008, Goodyear announced the launch of an environmentally friendly tire produced using a cornstarch-based material. The Goodyear Eagle LS2000 partially replaces the traditional carbon black and silica with filler materials derived from corn starch thanks to "BioTRED compounding technology". The new technology increases the tires "flexibility and resistance to energy loss", which extend the tires life-span and lessen the impact on the environment. Similarly, Goodyear announced on April 22, 2008, that it had joined the U.S. Environmental Protection Agency's SmartWay Transport Partnership. The transport partnership is an attempt between the truck transportation industry and the EPA to reduce air pollution and greenhouse emissions as well as increase energy efficiency. The SmartWay partnership's tractors and trailers will use Goodyear's Fuel Max linehaul tires that increase fuel efficiency while reducing emissions. According to Goodyear and EPA officials "the fuel-efficient line-haul tires deliver up to 4% improved truck fuel economy, and when used with other SmartWay-qualified components, each 18- wheel tractor and trailer used in long-haul can produce savings of up to 4,000 gallons per year, or more than $11,000 annually."

=== Foreign Corrupt Practices Act charges ===
On February 24, 2015, Goodyear agreed to pay more than $16 million to settle Foreign Corrupt Practices Act "FCPA" charges that two of its African subsidiaries allegedly paid $3.2 million in bribes that generated $14,122,535 in illicit profits. The U.S. Securities and Exchange Commission "SEC" FCPA charges involved Goodyear subsidiaries in Kenya and Angola for allegedly paying bribes to government and private-sector workers in exchange for sales in each country. According to the SEC because "Goodyear did not prevent or detect these improper payments because it failed to implement adequate FCPA compliance controls at its subsidiaries" and, for the Kenyan subsidiary, "because it failed to conduct adequate due diligence" prior to its acquisition. It was not alleged that Goodyear had any involvement with or knowledge of its subsidiaries' improper conduct.

=== Internal training and discrimination ===
On August 18, 2020, WIBW, a local CBS-affiliate television station, reported that an internal PowerPoint slide on political attire from a Topeka, Kansas, training seminar was circulating on social media. The leaked slide depicted a "zero tolerance" policy towards some political movements. President Donald Trump called for a boycott of Goodyear tires the following day, as Trump campaign attire such as MAGA hats were among the banned products. Goodyear responded via Twitter, stating "the visual in question was not created or distributed by Goodyear corporate, nor was it part of a diversity training class". Following release of the audio that went with the slide, Goodyear admitted the slide was used at its Topeka factory.

=== Tire blowouts ===
Defective tires are suspected to be the cause of multiple truck accidents and fatal injuries that occurred in France, Spain and other European countries in the 2010s, according to an investigation published in the French daily Le Monde in March 2024. According to the journalists, although Goodyear was aware of the problems, it did not recognize them. While the company quietly withdrew defective tires from the market and offered indemnities to the family of victims, it did not initially recognize the tires were defective and did not implement the European Union rapid alert system for unsafe consumer products, called Rapex.

== Manufacturing and development facilities ==
Location	DOT plant code	Division and Product or activity
Akron, Ohio, United States	MB/1MB	The Goodyear Tire & Rubber Co. – Global headquarters, North America headquarters, Goodyear Dunlop Tires North America headquarters, innovation center, racing tires, chemicals, tire proving grounds, airship operations
Bayport, Texas, United States		Goodyear Chemical – Chemicals
Beaumont, Texas, United States		Goodyear Tire & Rubber Co. – Synthetic Rubber
Clarksdale, Mississippi, United States		The Goodyear Tire & Rubber Co. – Bladders, Mixed Stock, Compounding
Danville, Virginia, United States	MC/1MC	The Goodyear Tire & Rubber Co. – Aircraft tires, commercial tires
Fayetteville, North Carolina, United States	PJ/1PJ	The Goodyear Tire & Rubber Co. – Passenger car tires
Findlay, Ohio, United States	UP/1UP	Cooper Tire & Rubber Co. – Consumer Tires, Technical Center, Tire Molds
Gadsden, Alabama, United States	MD/1MD	The Goodyear Tire & Rubber Co. – Passenger car tires
Hebron, Ohio, United States	P1/1P1	The Goodyear Tire & Rubber Co. – Development Center
Houston, Texas, United States		The Goodyear Tire & Rubber Co. – Synthetic Rubber
Kingman, Arizona, United States		The Goodyear Tire & Rubber Co. – Aircraft Tire Retreading
Lawton, Oklahoma, United States	M6/1M6	The Goodyear Tire & Rubber Co. – Consumer tires
Niagara Falls, New York, United States		Goodyear Chemical – Chemicals
Pompano Beach, Florida, United States		The Goodyear Tire & Rubber Co. – Airship Operations
San Angelo, Texas, United States		The Goodyear Tire & Rubber Co. – Tire Proving Grounds
San Francisco, California, United States		The Goodyear Tire & Rubber Co. – Innovation Lab
Social Circle, Georgia, United States		The Goodyear Tire & Rubber Co. – Tread Rubber
Statesville, North Carolina, United States		The Goodyear Tire & Rubber Co. – Tire Molds
Stockbridge, Georgia, United States		The Goodyear Tire & Rubber Co. – Aircraft Tire Retreading
Texarkana, Arkansas, United States	UT/1UT	Cooper Tire & Rubber Co. – Consumer Tires
Topeka, Kansas, United States	MJ/1MJ	The Goodyear Tire & Rubber Co. – Commercial tires, OTR tires
Tupelo, Mississippi, United States	U9/1U9	Cooper Tire & Rubber Co. – Consumer Tires
São Paulo, Brazil	MX/1MX	Companhia Goodyear Do Brazil – Latin America headquarters, aircraft tires, aircraft tire retreading
Americana, São Paulo, Brazil	Y1/1Y1	Companhia Goodyear Do Brazil – Tire proving grounds, consumer tires, commercial tires, OTR tires
Napanee, Ontario, Canada	4B/14B	Goodyear Canada, Inc. – Passenger car tires
North Bay, Ontario, Canada		Goodyear Canada, Inc. Off The Road -Construction and Mining
Medicine Hat, Alberta, Canada	PC/1PC	The Goodyear Tire & Rubber Co. Of Canada Ltd – Consumer tires
Valleyfield, Quebec, Canada		– Mixing center
Santiago, Chile	M7/1M7	Goodyear De Chile, S.A.I.C. – Consumer tires
Shahekou District, China	7L/17L	The Goodyear Tire & Rubber Co. –
Pulandian, Dalian, China	TC/1TC	Goodyear Dalian Tire Company Ltd. – Consumer tires, commercial tires
Cali, Colombia	MY/1MY	Goodyear De Colombia, S.A. – Commercial tires, OTR tires
Wolverhampton, United Kingdom	NB/1NB	The Goodyear Tyre & Rubber Co. – THE GOODYEAR TYRE & Rubber Co.
Amiens, France	NC/1NC	Goodyear France S.A. – Consumer tires (Closed)
Montluçon, France	DK/1DK	Dunlop France S.A. – Motorcycle and scooter tires, passenger car tires
Riom, France		– Truck tire retreading
Philippsburg, Germany	ND/1ND	Deutsche Goodyear GmbH – Warehouse
Fulda, Germany		– Passenger car tires
Hanau, Germany	DM/1DM	Dunlop GmbH – Passenger car tires and race tires
Riesa, Germany		– Passenger car tires
Fürstenwalde, Germany		– Passenger car tires
Wittlich, Germany		– Truck tires and truck tire retreading
Grand Duchy Of Luxembourg	KM/1 km	The Lee Tire & Rubber Co.(Goodyear S.A. Colmar-Berg) – Goodyear Innovation center Luxembourg (GIC*L), regional calendering center, commercial tires, OTR tires, tire proving grounds, tire molds, tire plant
Grand Duchy Of Luxembourg	NJ/1NJ	Goodyear S.A. –
Waluj, India	1W/11W	Goodyear India Ltd –
Gurgaon, India	NK/1NK	Goodyear India Ltd. –
Bogor, Indonesia	NL/1NL	The Goodyear Tire & Rubber Ltd. –
Dudelange, Luxembourg	L1/1L1	Goodyear Dunlop Tires Operations SA – Passenger car tires
Selangor, Malaysia	T8/1T8	Goodyear Malaysia Berhad –
San Luis Potosí, Mexico	PL/1PL	Goodyear – SLP, S de R.L. de C.V. – Consumer tires
Tilburg, Netherlands		– Aircraft tire retreading
Lima, Peru	NT/1NT	Compania Goodyear Del Peru – Consumer tires, commercial tires
Dębica, Poland		– Passenger Car Tires, Truck Tires
Kranj, Slovenia		– Passenger car tires and truck tires
Uitenhage, South Africa	NW/1NW	The Goodyear Tire & Rubber Co. (S.A.) (Pty) Ltd. – Consumer tires, commercial tires, agricultural tires, OTR tires
Bangkok, Thailand	NY/1NY	Goodyear (Thailand) Ltd. – Consumer tires, aircraft tires, aircraft retreading
Adapazarı, Turkey	CO/C01	Goodyear Lastikleri TAS – Consumer tires
İzmit, Turkey	PA/1PA	Goodyear Lastikleri TAS – Commercial tires
Valencia, Venezuela	PB/1PB	CA Goodyear De Venezuela –

== Motorsport ==
Goodyear was a longtime tire supplier in Formula One, claiming a record 24 drivers' championships and 26 constructors' championships. It was the sole provider in 1987 and 1988, then from 1992 to 1996. The company pulled out of the sport after the 1998 season.

Goodyear won the Indianapolis 500 in 29 editions. Its first win was in 1919, but left after the 1921 edition. It returned in 1963 and began a tire war with Firestone, which quit for 1975. In 1996 Bridgestone joined the CART World Series and the Indy Racing League, and Goodyear dropped out of major open-wheel racing after the 1999 season.

The company has been a tire supplier for NASCAR stock car series since 1954. It has been the sole supplier since 1975 except for short invervals. In 1997 it became the exclusive tire supplier for the three national series (Cup, O'Reilly and Truck).

In sports car racing, Goodyear was the 24 Hours of Le Mans overall winner in 14 editions from 1965 to 1997. It was absent from the race between 2006 and 2018. The brand returned to the FIA World Endurance Championship in 2019, becoming the exclusive supplier for the LMP2 class in 2021 and for the LMGT3 class in 2024. The brand also competed in the Can-Am, IMSA GT Championship, FIA GT Championship and American Le Mans Series among others. In addition, the Circuit de la Sarthe's traditional bridge has Goodyear branding since 2026.

Goodyear is the exclusive supplier of the National Hot Rod Association national classes since 2001, the European Truck Racing Championship since 2003, and the British Touring Car Championship since 2020. Previously, Goodyear was the supplier for the World Touring Car Cup from 2020 to 2022. It won the Karting World Championship senior class from 1971 to 1975.

In motorcycling, Kenny Roberts used Goodyears at Grand Prix motorcycle racing from 1978 to 1981. It also supplied the AMA Grand National Championship until 2015.

== Goodyear blimps ==
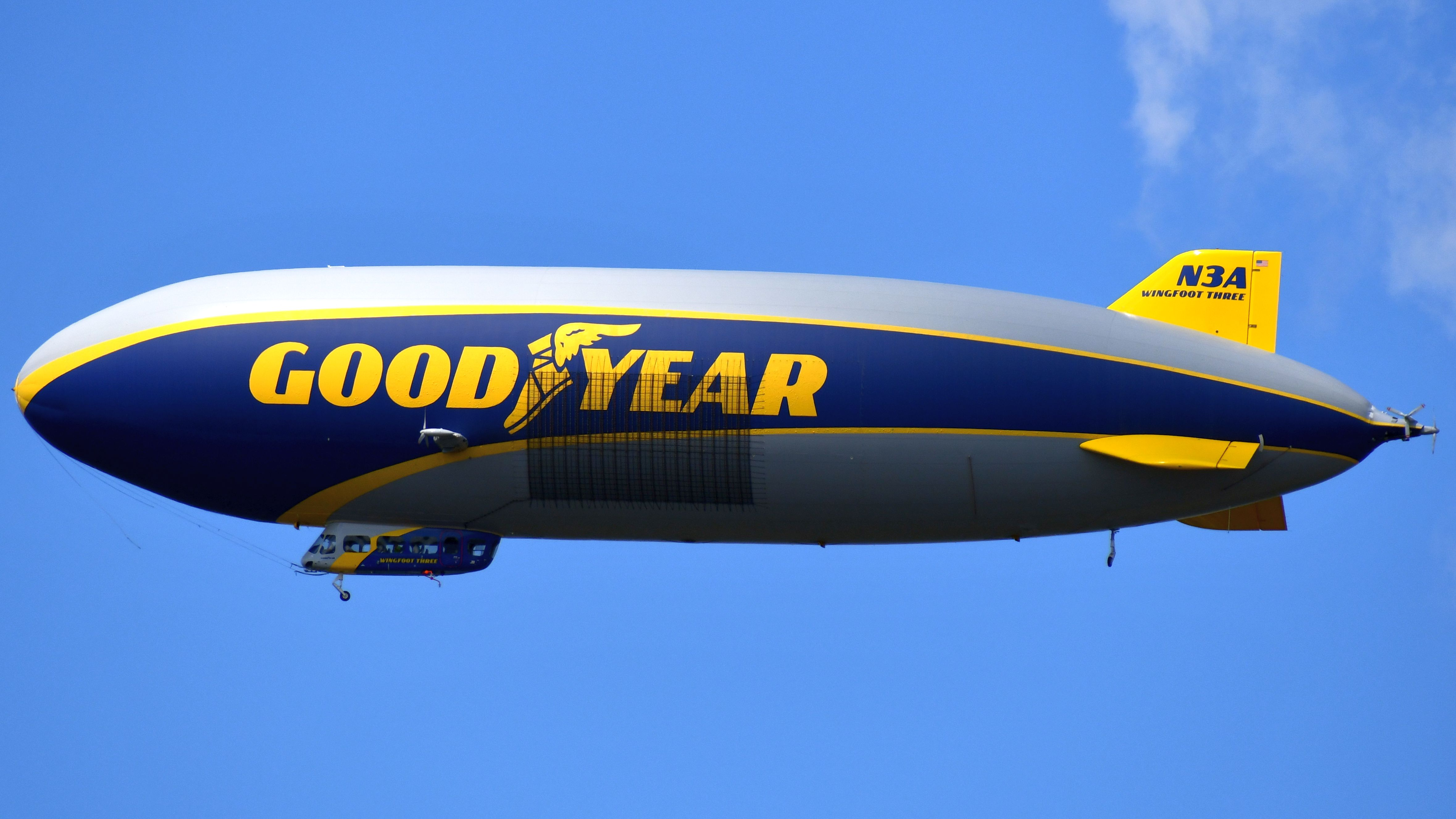
Wingfoot Three

The Goodyear Blimps are a fleet of airships used mainly for advertising purposes and capturing aerial views of live sporting events for television. The Pilgrim in 1925 was Goodyear's first blimp used for advertising.

Beginning in 2014, Goodyear began retiring their GZ-20 airships and replacing them with the Zeppelin NT. Wingfoot One, the first semi-rigid Zeppelin in Goodyear's U.S. fleet, was christened on August 23, 2014, at the Wingfoot Lake Airship Hangar near Akron. The fleet consists of Wingfoot One, based in Pompano Beach, Florida; Wingfoot Two, based in Carson, California; and Wingfoot Three, based in Suffield, Ohio.

== Leadership ==
=== President ===
1. D. E. Holl, 1898–1899
2. R. C. Penfield, 1899–1903
3. L. C. Miles, 1903–1906
4. Frank A. Seiberling, 1906–1921
5. E. G. Wilmer, 1921–1923
6. G. M. Stadelman, 1923–1926
7. Paul W. Litchfield, 1926–1940
8. Edwin J. Thomas, 1940–1958
9. Russell DeYoung, 1958–1971
10. Victor Holt Jr., 1971–1972
11. Charles J. Pilliod Jr., 1972–1974
12. John H. Gerstenmaier, 1974–1978
13. Robert E. Mercer, 1978–1982
14. Tom H. Barrett, 1982–

=== Chairman of the Board ===
1. Paul W. Litchfield, 1930–1958
2. E. J. Thomas, 1958–1964
3. Russell DeYoung, 1964–1974
4. Charles J. Pilliod Jr., 1974–1983
5. Robert E. Mercer, 1983–

== See also ==
- List of tire companies
- NASCAR Canadian Tire Series
