= Douglas Tires =

Trademark of Goodyear

Company logo

Douglas is the trademark for a line of tires owned by the Goodyear Tire and Rubber Company, which manufactures the line and sells them exclusively through Walmart. Goodyear registered the name in 1992 through its subsidiary Kelly Springfield Tire Company.

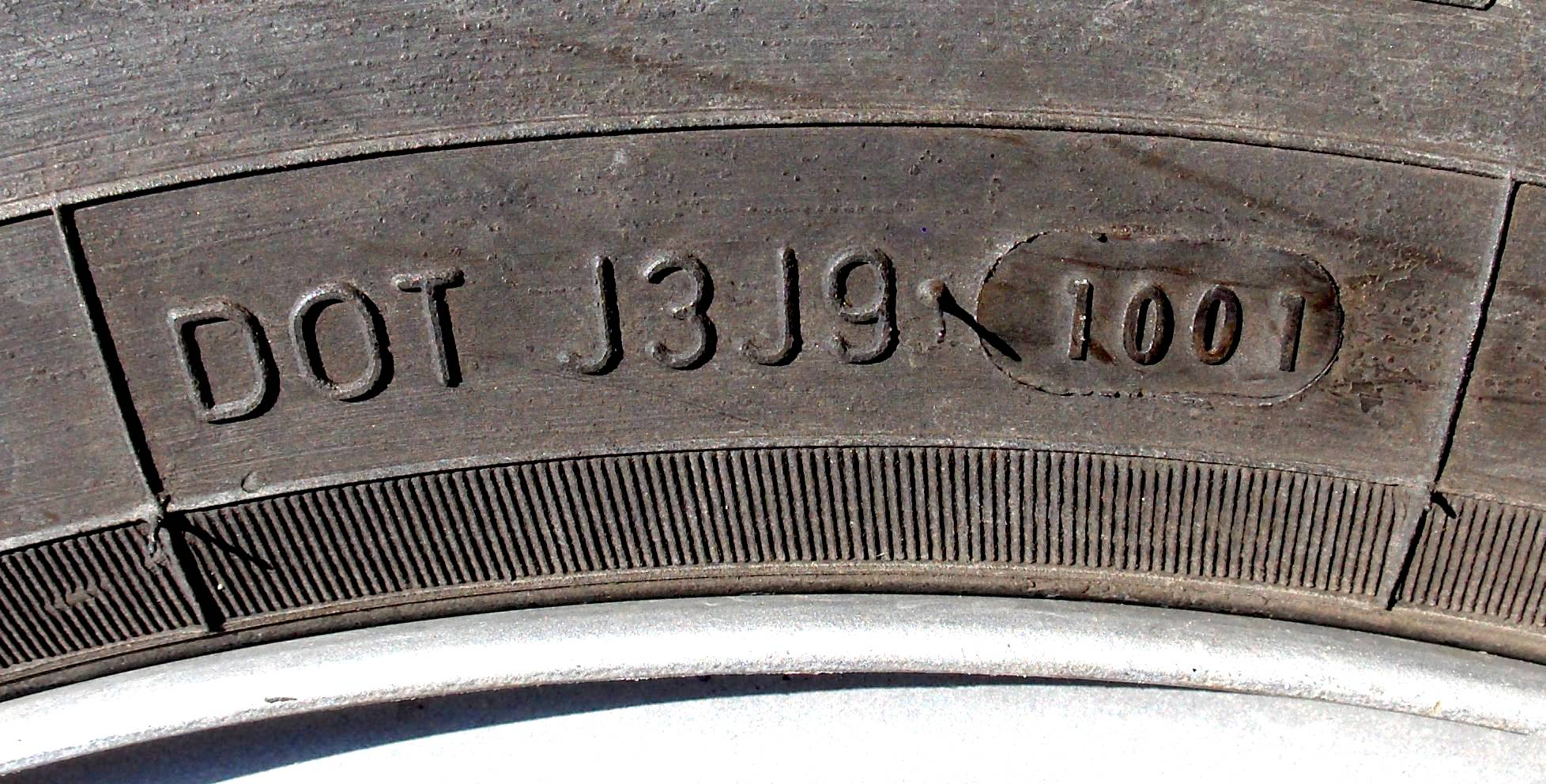
Typical DOT code

The actual location of manufacture of a Douglas tire can be determined through the first two characters following the "DOT" of the DOT code molded into the sidewall and consulting the NHTSA Manufacturers Information Database.
