= Hangzhou Zhongce Rubber Company =

Chinese tyre manufacturer

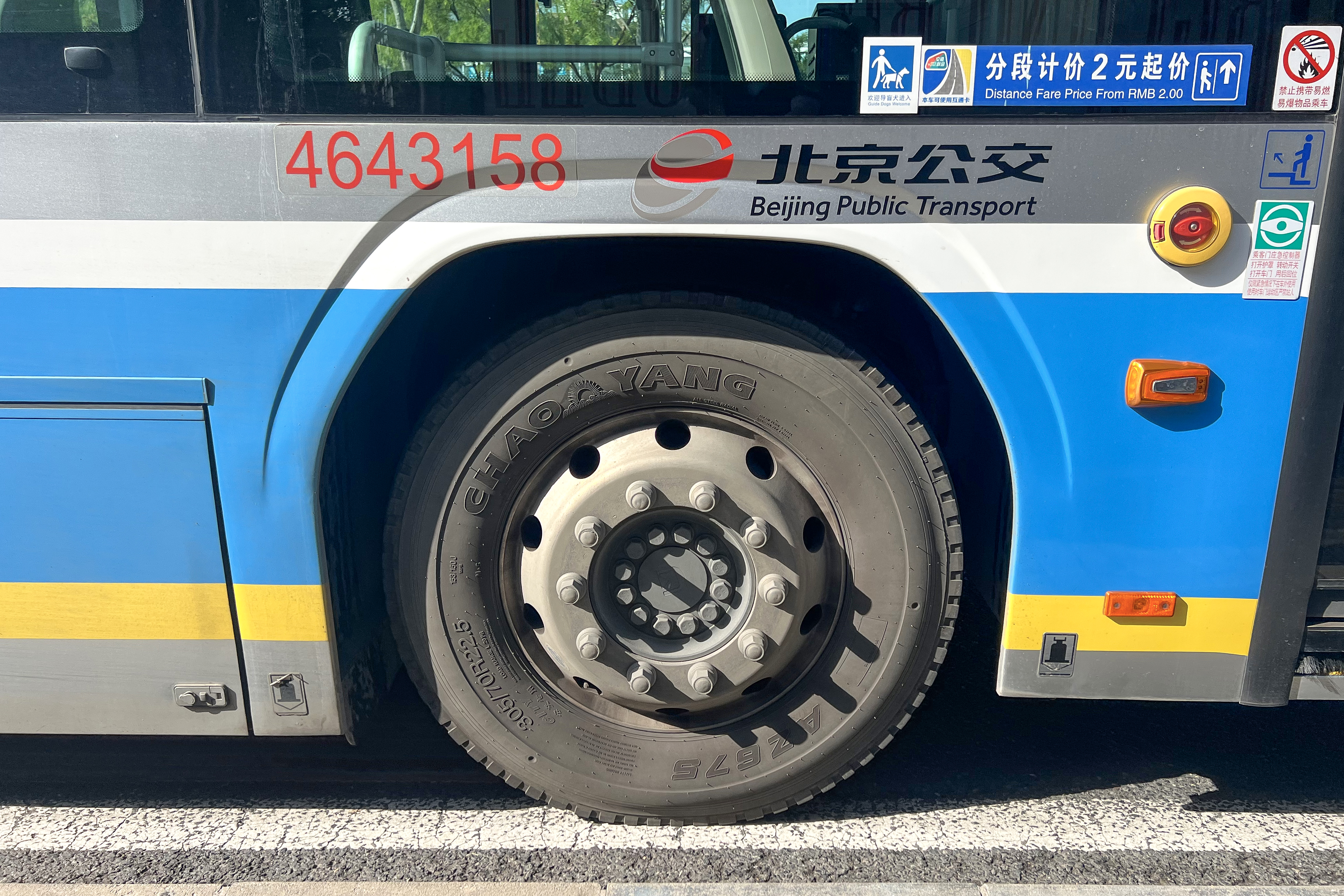
Front wheel of a bus with Chaoyang tyre

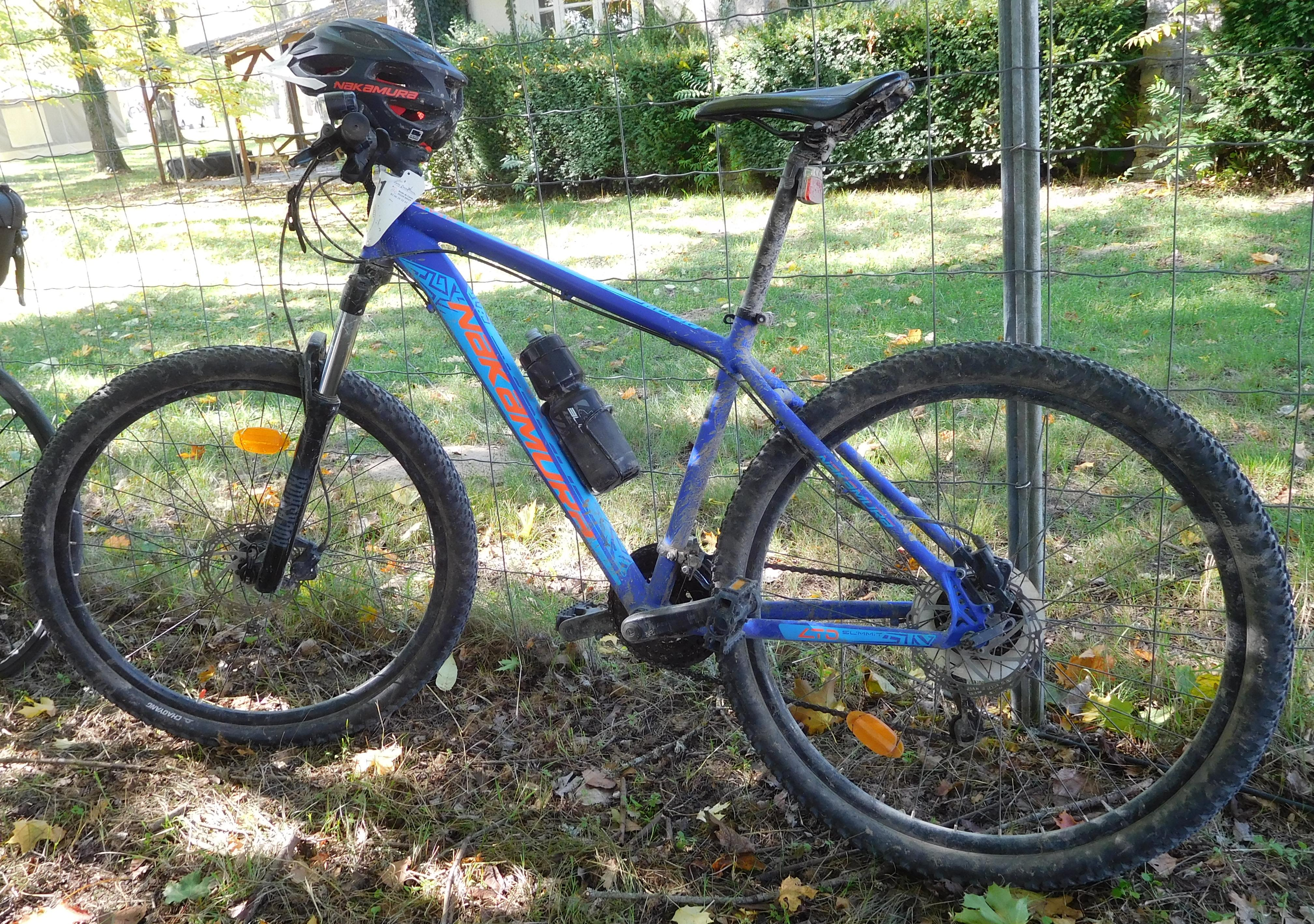
Mountain bike equipped with Chaoyang tyres

Hangzhou Zhongce Rubber Co., Ltd. (Chinese: 杭州中策橡膠, SSE: 603049) is China's largest manufacturer of automotive tyres. The company manufactures a variety of tyres for cars, trucks, motorcycles, scooters, bicycles, tractors, ATVs and other vehicles. Tyre brands produced by the company include Chaoyang, Goodride, Westlake, Arisun and Trazano.

It began as the Hangzhou Rubber Factory in 1958.

In 2011, it was the tenth largest tyre maker in the world, with $4.26 billion worth of sales.

In 2015, Zenises announced the launch of its new Westlake retail network in Spain and Portugal.

On June 5, 2025, it debuted on the Shanghai Stock Exchange after raising approximately 4.07 billion yuan in its IPO.
