= Vittoria (company) =

Italian bicycle tire manufacturer

Vittoria S.p.A.
- Trade name: Vittoria
- Company type: Joint-stock company
- Industry: tire
- Founded: 1953; 73 years ago
- Headquarters: Brembate, Italy
- Area served: Worldwide
- Products: bicycle tire and wheelsets for cycling
- Website: vittoria.com

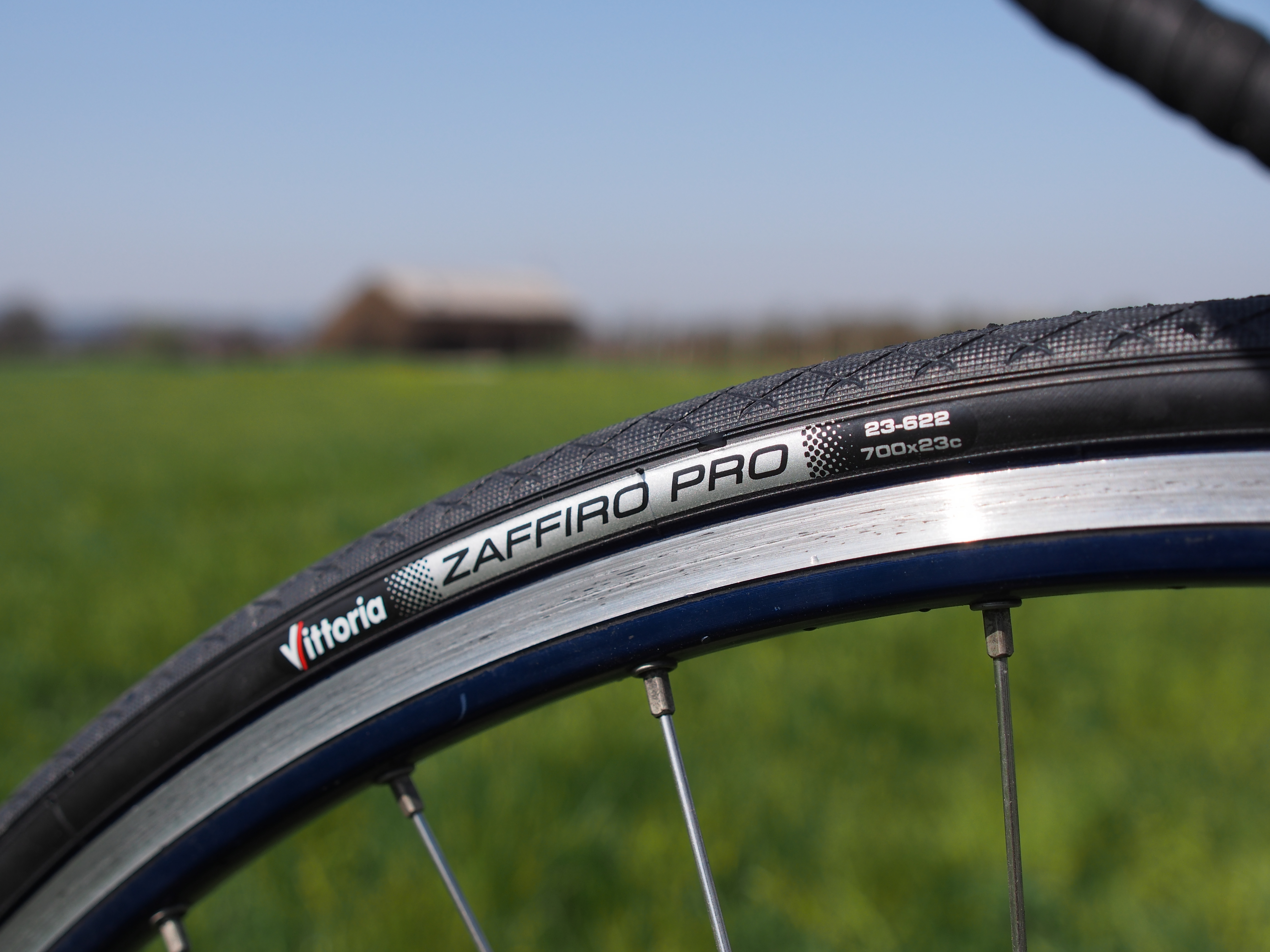
Vittoria Zaffiro tire for road bicycle.

Vittoria S.p.A. is an Italian bicycle tire manufacturer established in 1953. The company has more than 1000 employees around the world, produces 5 million road and mountain bike tires

== Locations ==
In 2020, headquarters were moved back to Italy (Brembate) as a private equity fund from Milan bought the company from its previous Dutch owners.

Vittoria facilities around the world include:

- Vittoria S.p.A., in Brembate, Italy
  - Vittoria Industries North America Inc., in Oklahoma City, USA
  - Vittoria Industries North America Inc., in Salem, Massachusetts, USA
  - Lion Tyres (Thailand) Co., Ltd., in Bangkok, Thailand
  - Vittoria Industries Ltd., in Hong Kong
  - Vittoria Logistics Taiwan, in Taipei, Taiwan
  - Vittoria Internazionale Ltd. Taiwan Branch, in Taichung, Taiwan

== See also ==
- List of bicycle parts
- List of Italian companies
