= Casumina =

Vietnamese tire manufacturer

Casumina Company
- Company type: Public
- Industry: Manufacturing
- Founded: 1976; 50 years ago
- Headquarters: Ho Chi Minh City, Vietnam
- Products: Motor vehicle tires
- Website: www.casumina.com

The Southern Rubber Industry Joint Stock Company (Vietnamese: Công ty cổ phần Công Nghiệp Cao Su Miền Nam), or Casumina, is a tire manufacturer in Vietnam. It has factories in the south of Vietnam producing tyres and inner tubes for bicycles, motorcycles, cars, light truck, trucks, forklifts, and tractors.

== Products ==
- Trucks and light trucks tires and tubes
- Motorbike tires and tubes
- Bike tires and tubes
- Industrial tires and tubes
- Forklift tires
- Agricultural and gardening tires and tubes
- Technical rubber spare parts
- Latex gloves, condoms
- Conveyor belts, V-belts
- Bridge bearings and dock fenders.

In 2009 it produced the following quantities:

- Bicycle tires - 4.0 million (2008 4.19 million)
- Motorcycle tires - 4.95 m (2008 4.68m)
- Car tires - 0.807m (2008 0.682m)
- Motor cycle tubes 20m (2008 16.4m)
- Total sales 2504 billion dong (2152 billion dong)
- Operating profit 328 billion dong (4.66 billion dong)
- Exports US$57.2 million (US$74.6million)

== Euromina ==
Euromina is a brand name of Casumina, created in 2008. Euromina is a product for scooters.
