= Zenises =

- Industry: Manufacturing, distribution
- Founded: 2014; 12 years ago
- Headquarters: Dubai, UAE; London,United Kingdom
- Key people: Harjeev Kandhari (CEO)
- Products: Tyres
- Website: www.zenises.com

Zenises is a multinational tyre company with headquarters in Dubai and London with four other offices in Germany, Italy, Spain, and Australia.

Founded in 2014 by CEO Harjeev Kandhari, a third generation tyre entrepreneur, the company designs and produces its own private label tyre, or "tire" in America, brands in partnership with manufacturing facilities in Asia. The organisation's name combines the words ‘Zen’ and ‘Genesis’ to demonstrate their reflective corporate philosophy.

In 2016, Zenises entered the Guinness Book of World Records by presenting the world's most expensive tire at US$600,000 for a set of four tyres.

Zenises donates 10% of all profits to its own charity (the Zenises Foundation) to support, feed, educate underprivileged families and children.

== Guinness Book of World Records ==
Z Tyre designed a special set of Z1 tyres to be unveiled at Reifen Essen 2016 and entered the Guinness Book of World Records for producing the world's most expensive set of car tyres, valued at $600,000.

The Z-branded 295/35 ZR21 107Y XL tyres were produced in the Sentury Tire factory in Quindago, Shandong Province, China. They were designed in Dubai by Zenises CEO Harjeev Kandhari, decorated with diamonds by artisan jewelers in Italy before being returned to Dubai for the application of 24-karat gold leafing.

The tyres were sold to a private buyer and all profits were donated to the Zenises Foundation.

== Brands ==
Zenises is the proprietor of the European ZTYRE.COM and T tyre brand names and distributes and markets many other tyre brands including:

- Westlake
- Triangle
- iLink
- Kapsen
- Ardent

Unveiled in 2014, Z Tyre is the private tyre brand of Zenises. Designed and produced for high performance cars and SUV fitments, Z Tyre now counts a range of over 70 dimensions and also incorporates run-flat technology tyres.

Westlake's tyres are produced by the Hangzhou Zhongce Rubber Company. In April 2015, Zenises announced the launch of its new Westlake distribution in Spain and Portugal, aiming to ultimately establish 100 Westlake retail outlets. Zenises has exclusive distribution agreements for the sale of the Westlake car and truck tyre brand in several European countries.

Zenises began distributing Triangle truck and bus tyres in Germany at the start of 2016.

In 2015, Zenies started distributing the Kapsen tyre brand in Spain and Italy and agreed to develop channels for the Ardent car tyre range across Europe.

iLink is a new truck and bus tyre brand distributed by Zenises.

== New business model ==
In 2016, Zenises announced its Z Tyre Flat Rate program in Germany, with its partner Alzura. A monthly subscription covers all new tyre related costs, and allows customers to fit or upgrade tyres when needed. The service is currently available in Germany through Alzura X and its 600 partner stores nationwide.

== Zenises Foundation ==
The Zenesis Foundation has three areas of focus:

- Z Aspire provides support to underprivileged children throughout their education until masters level. It also provides three scholarships to Oxford University, as well as an endowment for a university chair at St Peter's College.
- T OuTreach has been established to identify and support good causes. The initiative works with local and international communities where Zenises operates to support and mentor college students.
- Westlake Wishes ensures that impoverished families and children get daily nutritious food. The initiative provides nourishing four-course meals to 125,000 people in a single day in India. In South Africa, it provided a daily nutritious breakfast for all the children at the Kiddies' Paradise School in Rosettenville, Johannesburg.

== Zenises Motorsports ==
The Zenises Motorsport team competes in global drifting events. In 2014, lead racer Steve 'Baggsy' Biagioni competed in 24 competition events with the Acorn Zenises Motorsport Nissan S13. In the same year, Baggsy lifted the Kings of the Kings Superfinals trophy at the event in Valletta, Malta.

In 2016, the Zenises Motorsport team competes in two racing series — the global Drift Allstars series and the British Drift Championship. In January 2016, Steve Biagioni won the inaugural event at Yas Marina Circuit in Abu Dhabi. Baggsy also won the Drift All Stars Final in Hungary in August.

Zenises also sponsored a new rally car for 2016, a modified BMW E36 Compact that will race in Germany, Belgium and Luxembourg.

Other drivers in the Acorn Zenises Motorsport team include Michael Marshall.
