= Carlisle Companies =

American building products company

Carlisle Companies Incorporated
- Type: Public
- Traded as: NYSE: CSL; S&P 400 Component
- Industry: Commercial roofing, insulation, metal roofing, building envelope systems, air barriers, waterproofing.
- Founded: 1917; 109 years ago
- Headquarters: Scottsdale, Arizona, United States
- Key people: D. Christian Koch President, CEO Kevin Zdimal VP, CFO Scott Selbach VP, General Counsel
- Revenue: ▲US$5.02 billion (2025)
- Net income: ▼US$741 million (2025)
- Number of employees: 5,000
- Website: carlisle.com

Carlisle Companies Incorporated is a supplier of construction products that make buildings more energy efficient and resilient. The company manufactures and sells single-ply roofing products as well as warranted systems and accessories for the commercial building industry. The company is organized into two segments, including Carlisle Construction Materials and Carlisle Weatherproofing Technologies. The company's product portfolio includes moisture protection products, protective roofing underlayments, integrated air and vapor barriers, spray polyurethane foam and coating systems, and others. The majority of the company's revenue comes from the Carlisle Construction Materials segment, and more than half of the total revenue is earned in the United States.

== History ==
=== Early history (1917-1999) ===
Carlisle Companies was founded in 1917 in Carlisle, Pennsylvania. In its early years the company gained scale as a key player in the tire market and pursued a holding company strategy to become a large diversified industrial company by the end of the 20th century.

=== 2000-present ===
In 2019, Carlisle acquired MicroConnex, a flex circuit manufacturer in Snoqualmie, Washington, as well as Providien LLC, a medical device manufacturer in San Diego, California, and incorporated them into CIT to increase the company's exposure to the medical technology market.

In 2021, Carlisle acquired Henry Company, a provider of building envelope systems (air barriers and waterproofing) for residential and commercial construction. It has also acquired Accella in 2017 and MTL Holdings (MTL) in 2024.

== See also ==
- List of S&P 400 companies
