= Kelly-Springfield Tire Company =

Tire manufacturing company

Kelly Springfield Tire Company
- Company type: Subsidiary
- Industry: Manufacturing
- Founded: 1894; 132 years ago, in Springfield, Ohio
- Founder: Edwin Kelly and Arthur Grant
- Defunct: 1999
- Fate: Acquired by the Goodyear Tire & Rubber Company
- Headquarters: Akron, Ohio, United States
- Products: Tires
- Parent: Goodyear Tire and Rubber Company
- Website: kellytires.com

The Kelly-Springfield Tire Company was an American manufacturer of tires for motor vehicles. It was founded in Springfield, Ohio by Edwin Kelly and Arthur Grant in 1894. It was acquired in 1935 by the Goodyear Tire and Rubber Company, who maintained it as a subsidiary until 1999 when it was integrated into Goodyear North America. It continues today as a major brand under Goodyear.

== History ==
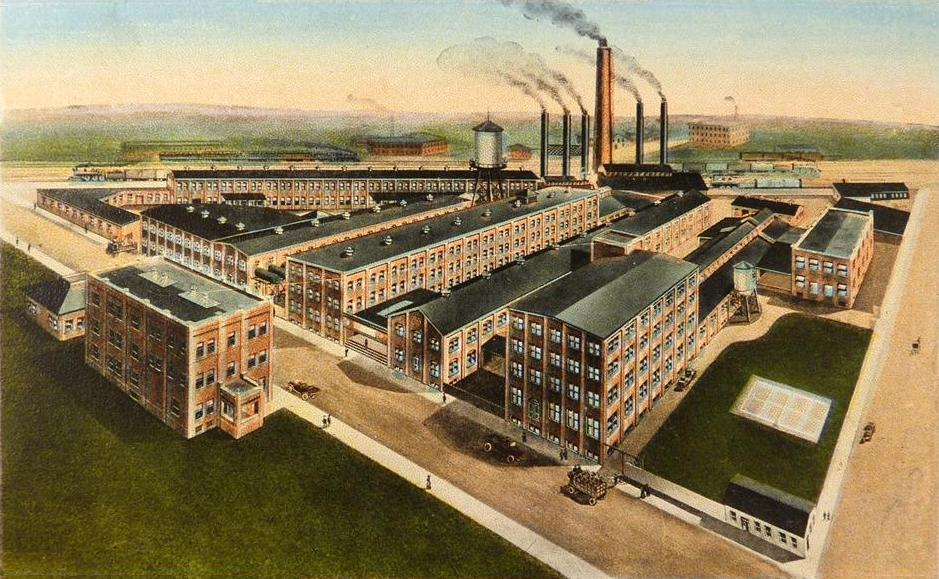
Kelly-Springfield Tire Company plant in Akron, Ohio c. 1920

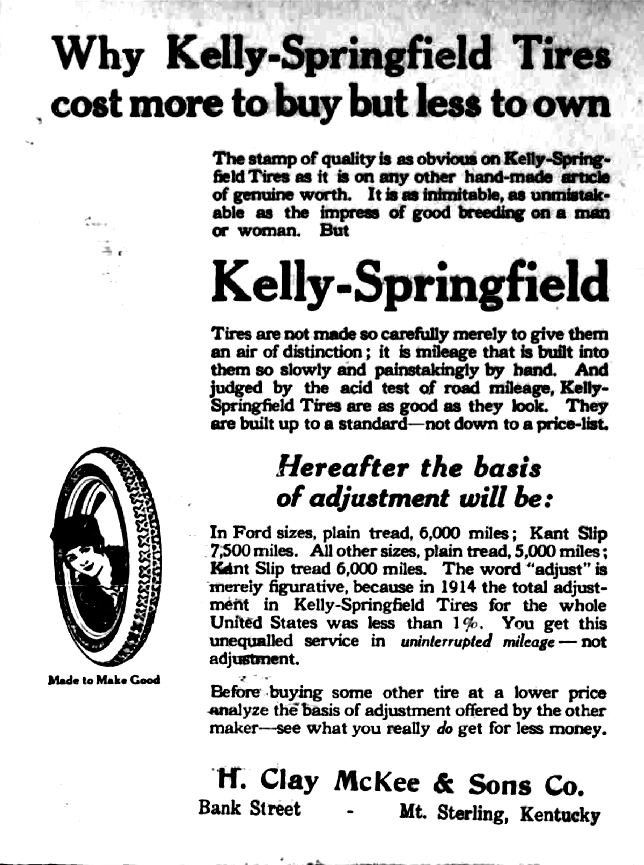
1915 Kelly-Springfield tire ad, from a Kentucky newspaper.

The company was sold to the McMillin group in 1899 for $1 million. Arthur Grant received $166,000 in stock and $33,000 in cash for his share of the company. The McMillin group renamed the new company Consolidated Rubber Tire Company and it continued under that name until 1914.

The name Kelly-Springfield Tire Company was given to the New York City sales subsidiary in 1911. Consolidated's name was changed in 1914. "The" was added to the front of the name in 1932 and it became The Kelly-Springfield Tire Company. Future movie star Norma Shearer was one of several women who portrayed "Miss Lotta Miles", a character who appeared in ads for the company.

Manufacturing was done at a plant in Akron, Ohio, and another plant was bought in Wooster, Ohio, in 1915 and used until 1921. The growth of the company continued until the president, Van Cartwell, decided to build a new plant in Cumberland, Maryland. An agreement was signed on November 4, 1916, details of which called for the city of Cumberland to provide a free 81-acre (33 ha) site and $750,000 toward construction of the plant. The city of Cumberland also agreed to make improvements for roads, water and sewerage lines and other essential construction. In turn, once operating, the plant began to employ over 3,000 people and had a production capacity of five times the production capacity of the company until that point. The first tire was built on April 2, 1921.

The Kelly Springfield Tire Company was sold in 1935 to the Goodyear Tire and Rubber Company and Edmund S. Burke became president. He served as president from 1935 until 1959. The company operated as a wholly owned subdivision. The company continued to grow until 1962 when it added a new plant in Tyler, Texas. Another plant was built in 1963 at Freeport, Illinois, and the third plant in 1969 in Fayetteville, North Carolina.

After 66 years of operation, the Cumberland plant was closed in 1987. In that same year the Lee Tire and Rubber Company came under the control of Kelly-Springfield. In November 1987 the corporate offices were moved to a new facility on Willowbrook Road in Cumberland. The original plant site was returned to the city.

In 1994 the Kelly-Springfield Tire Company celebrated 100 years. At that time it was the oldest tire company in the United States.

In the 1990s, Kelly-Springfield was absorbed by parent company Goodyear and moved its corporate headquarters to Akron, Ohio.

== See also ==
- Kelly-Springfield Motor Truck Company, also founded by Edwin Kelly
