= National Tire and Battery =

American brand of auto service centers

- Trade name: NTB Tire & Service Centers
- Type: Wholly owned subsidiary
- Industry: Automotive Services
- Predecessors: National Tire Warehouse; Tire America
- Founded: 1997; 29 years ago by the merger of National Tire Warehouse with Tire America
- Number of locations: 381 (2025)
- Services: tire sales and service, battery replacement, scheduled maintenance, oil changes, brakes, wheel alignments, and automotive repairs.
- Parent: Sears (1997–2003); TBC Corporation (2003–2023); Mavis Tire Express Services Corp. (2023–present)
- Website: www.ntb.com

National Tire and Battery (NTB) is an American brand of auto service centers. It was formerly owned by Sears until it was spun-off in 2003. In 2020, Mavis Tire Supply Co. bought 112 NTB Tire & Service Centers, leaving the parent TBC Corporation with 615 locations under the Tire Kingdom and NTB brands.

== History ==
Sears created the brand in 1997 by consolidating the Tire America (TA) and National Tire Warehouse (NTW) brands, adding the "B" to include its DieHard brand of batteries. Sears originally acquired both Tire America and National Tire Warehouse in 1988 when it acquired its then parent Western Auto Supply.

In 2003, Sears sold the brand, which consisted mostly of stores set apart from its name brand stores, to TBC Corporation. A Sears spokesman said, "Because of the separate branding and the lack of proximity to our retail operations, we weren't able to drive growth like a TBC could". The chain of 226 stores was reported to have brought in $425 million in revenue and $60 million in profit in 2002.

TBC Corporation includes Tire Kingdom, Merchant's Tire and Auto Centers and Big O Tire stores. Together they operate more than 1,200 locations in 41 states, the District of Columbia, and the Canadian provinces of Alberta and British Columbia.

In February 2020, TBC entered into an agreement with Mavis Discount Tire of New York to consolidate its footprint of locations by selling 112 NTB stores in Philadelphia, Boston, Atlanta and Chicago areas to Mavis, with approximately 512 NTB locations remaining under NTB's ownership.

== Services ==
National Tire and Battery specializes in Fluid Services (Oil Changes, Brake Fluid Exchange, Coolant Exchange, and Transmission Fluid Exchange), Battery Services, Wiper Blades, Brake Services, Steering & Suspension Services, and Vehicle Inspections.

== See also ==
- Big O Tires
- Midas
- Tire Kingdom
- Merchant's Tire and Auto
