= Merchant's Tire and Auto =

- Type: Subsidiary
- Industry: Automotive Services
- Founded: 1943; 83 years ago
- Founder: Merchant family
- Defunct: November 2018
- Fate: Many locations rebranded into the National Tire and Battery franchises
- Number of locations: over 1,200 (2016)
- Services: Oil changes, brake fluid exchange, coolant exchange, and transmission fluid rcchange, battery services, wiper blades, brake services, steering & suspension aervices, and vehicle inspections
- Parent: TBC Corporation (2000–present)
- Website: www.merchantstire.com

Merchant's Tire and Auto falls under the acquisition of Tire Kingdom by TBC Corporation.

There are approximately 120 stores nationwide as of July 17, 2015.

== History ==
Founded in 1943, the Merchant family from Manassas, VA owned and operated the first retail stores for Merchant's Tire and Auto. Over the next decades, the company expanded along the East Coast.

In the year 2003, Tire Kingdom purchased National Tire & Battery (NTB) and Merchant's Tire & Automotive Service.

== Services ==
Merchant's Tire and Auto Center specializes in fluid services (oil changes, brake fluid exchange, coolant exchange, and transmission fluid exchange), battery services, wiper blades, brake services, steering and suspension services, and vehicle inspections.

== See also ==
- Big O Tires
- Tire Kingdom
- National Tire and Battery
