= NTW =

NTW can refer to:

- Nanjangud Town railway station, Karnataka, India (station code: NTW)
- Napoleon: Total War, a 2010 video game
- National Theatre Wales, an English-language theatre company of Wales, United Kingdom
- National Tire Wholesale, an American tire distributor
- Nationwide Airlines (South Africa) (ICAO code: NTW)
- Negro Theatre Workshop, a former Black British theatre company
- New Territories West, part of the New Territories, Hong Kong
- Nottoway language, an indigenous language of the United States (ISO 639-3 code: ntw)

== See also ==
- Denel NTW-20, a South African anti-materiel rifle
