= American Flyer (disambiguation) =

American Flyer may refer to:

- American Flyer, a brand of toy train and model railroad
- American Flyer (band), an American rock group
- Western Flyer (bicycle), an American bicycle sold by Western Auto
- American Flyer (railcar), a lightweight passenger car
- An early name for the Acela Express

American Flyers may refer to:

- American Flyers, a 1985 film starring Kevin Costner
- American Flyers Airline, a U.S. airline that operated from 1949 to 1971
- American Flyers (Lake Compounce), a ride at Lake Compounce amusement park in Connecticut
