= Southgate Mall (Elizabeth City) =

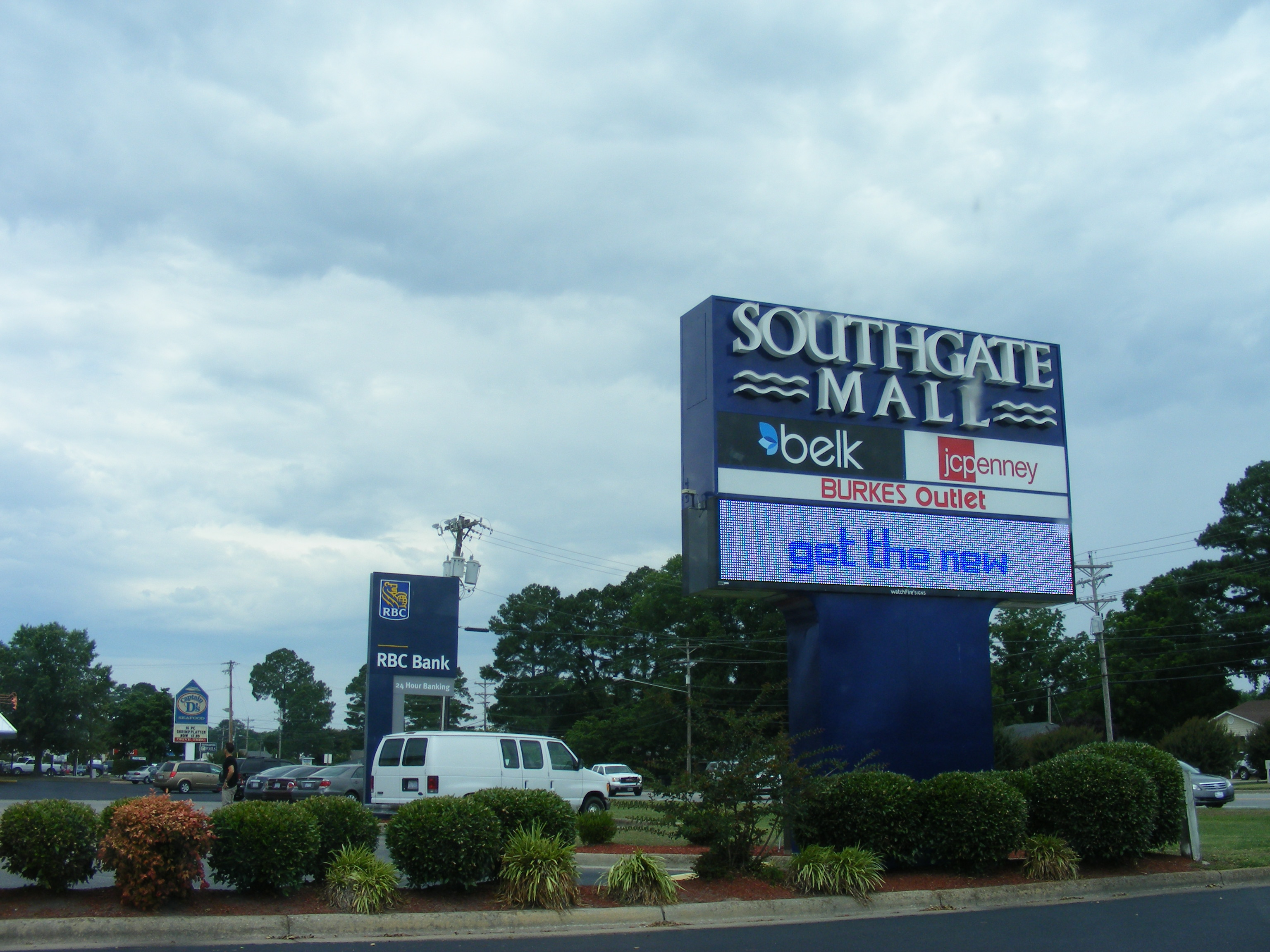
- 2011 Second-generation Southgate Mall sign, replacing original forty foot pylon. Sign replaced again in 2018
- Location: Elizabeth City, North Carolina, United States
- Coordinates: 36°17′44″N 76°13′30″W
- Address: 1409 West Ehringhaus Street
- Opened: 1969
- Manager: Thalhimer
- Num. of stores: 33 (27 vacant)
- Num. of anchor tenants: 1
- Floor area: 250,000 square feet (23,226 m^{2})
- Floors: 1
- Parking: 1,250 spaces
- Website: www.southgatemallec.com

Southgate Mall is the sole enclosed shopping center in the sixteen county Historic Albemarle region of northeastern North Carolina. Located on West Ehringhaus Street (US 17 Business) in Elizabeth City, North Carolina, the mall is currently anchored by Belk and until its closing in early April 2015; JCPenney.

Construction of the mall started in 1967 at a cost of $3 million ($21.2 million in 2014 dollars), opening two years later as Southgate Plaza Shopping Center with senior anchors Belk-Tyler and W. T. Grant. Junior anchors Winn-Dixie and Peoples Drug filled positions intermediate to anchors and smaller shops.

== Senior anchors ==
- Belk (67,000 sq ft (6,225 m^{2})), 1 floor.

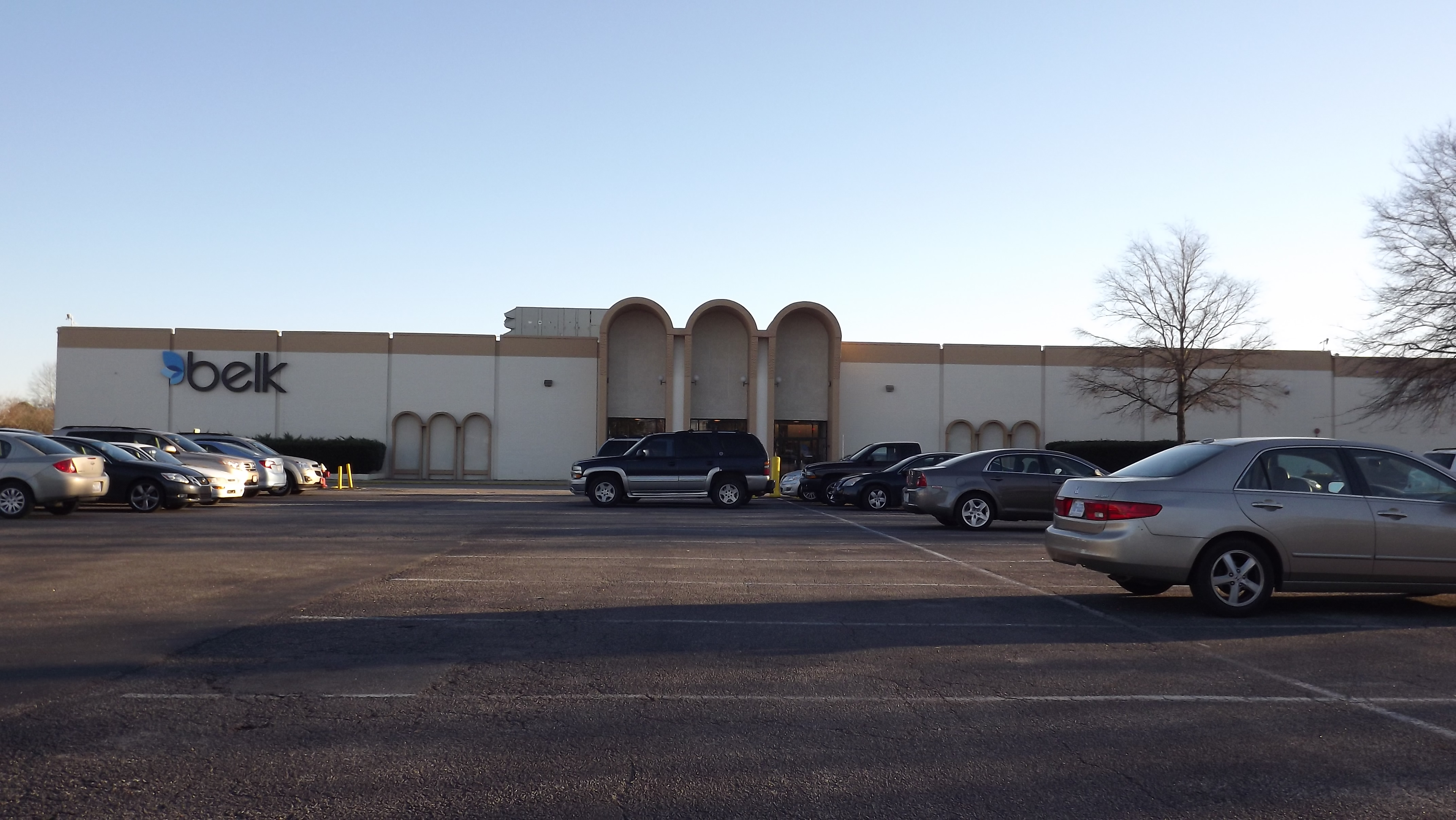
Elizabeth City Belk in January 2015. One of three late 1960s prototype stores designed for smaller-format enclosed malls, the other two are in Kinston, NC and Savannah, GA. All except the Southgate location have since been heavily modified beyond their original appearances.

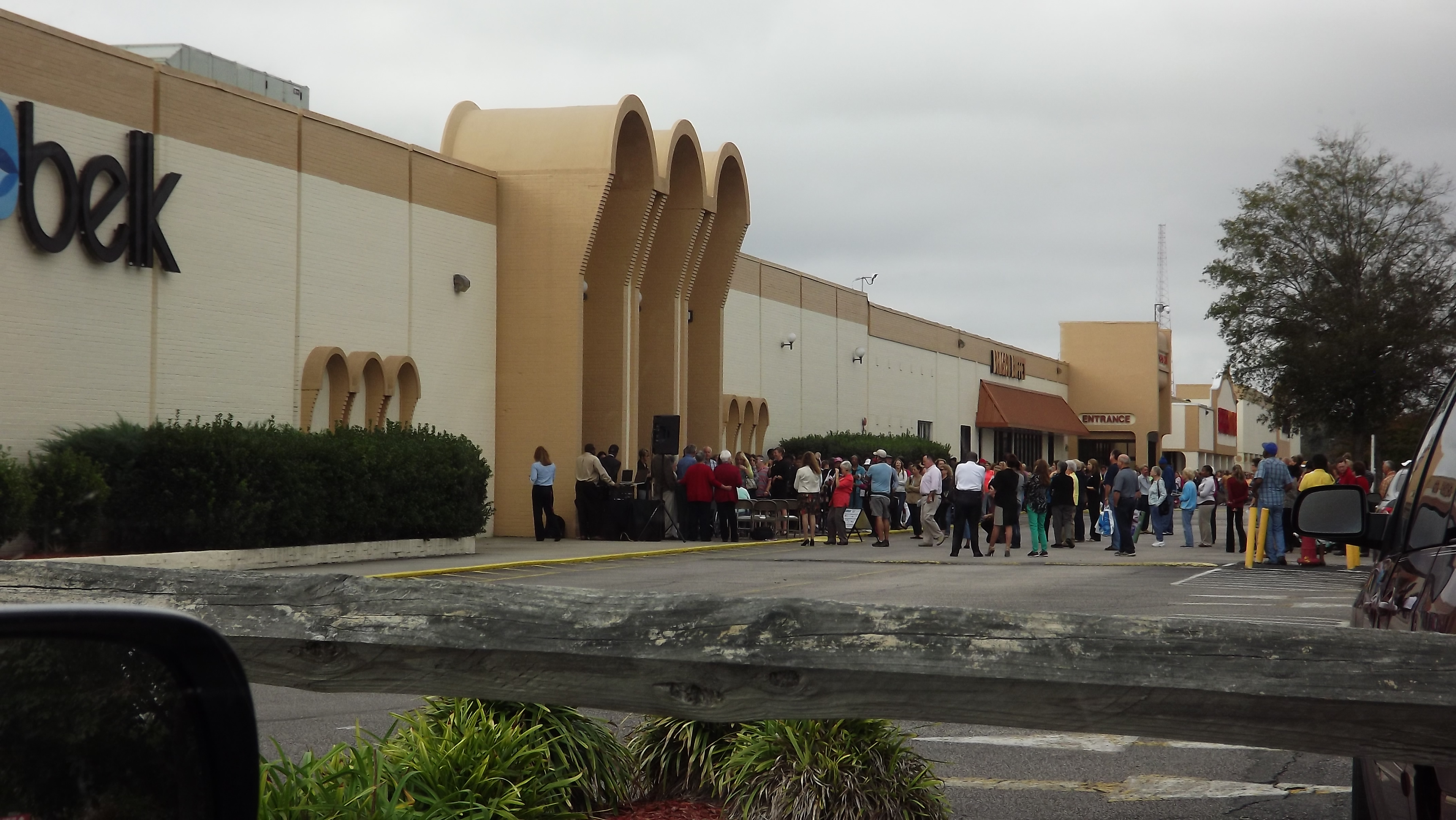
Elizabeth City Belk during renovation re-dedication in October 2013. The store's first extensive renovation since 1988 radically rearranged its interior configuration, but did not affect the exterior.

Belk remains the sole original anchor, having undisputed domain over Southgate's eastern end since 1969. The Southgate location is notable as one of the first three mall-based prototypes Belk developed in the mid to late 1960s as the company prepared to transition from downtown and strip mall locations to enclosed malls.

Boasting preformed concrete arches, these prototypes were among the first mall-based Belk stores to have a distinctive architectural design, one that paved the way for countless facade variations among all future Belk stores. Alas, the other two prototypes located in Vernon Park Mall, Kinston, NC and Oglethorpe Mall, Savannah, GA, have since had their exteriors heavily modified beyond original resemblance.

The Elizabeth City store is the last prototype to retain its original arched architecture, albeit as of October 2012 having beige paint obscure the once-bare concrete arches. Another innovation was the circular arrangement of drywall-partitioned departments surrounding a central jewelry department, now standard among modern department stores, but unique for the 1960s where many stores retained open floor plans.

However, extensive renovations in 1988 and October 2013 have since radically altered the decor and layout, gradually removing outmoded features such as the garden center (mid 1990s), catalog/bill paying area (early 2000s), tailoring room (2013) and various specialized display alcoves (kitchenwares – early 2000s, juniors – early 2000s, fine china – 2013, etc.), all of which were converted into additional storage. All of these spaces returned to the sales floor during the store's $1.8 million 2013 renovation, eliminating most remaining alcoves and angular walls in favor of 90 degree corners and straight walls, especially along the store's perimeter.

- Vacant (41,421 sq ft (3,848 m^{2})), 1 floor.
  - (Formerly W.T. Grant 64,200 sq. ft.; Rose's 64,200 sq. ft., 1 floor. and JCPenney 41,421 sq. ft.)

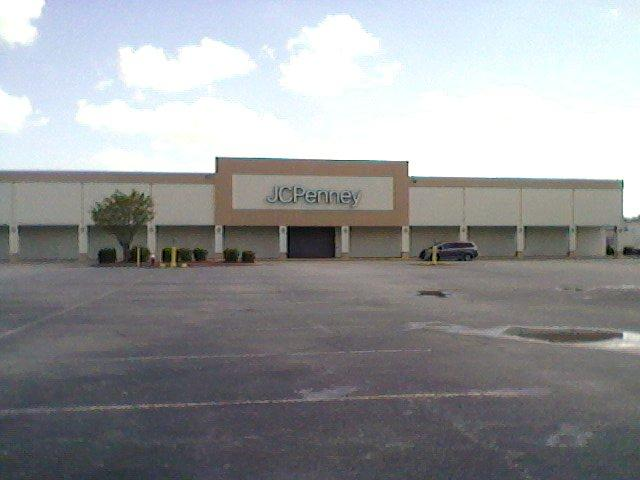
April 20, 2015 photo of the now-shuttered JCPenney at Elizabeth City, NC's Southgate Mall. Was W.T. Grant from 1969–74; Roses from 1974–94 and JCPenney from 1996–2015

The original West-end anchor W. T. Grant complemented the mall's one-stop shop appeal with auto repair bays and a garden center, persisting at Southgate until 1974. The space was immediately acquired by Rose's, which remained until corporate downsizing in 1994. The space was unoccupied for two years before JCPenney relocated in 1996 from the former Winn-Dixie space it had inhabited since the supermarket's departure in 1985 for an off-mall location. JCPenney declined the full volume of the Roses space, partitioning extra square footage into additional small shop spaces, two of which became home to an enlarged Hibbett Sports as well as an extension of the Goodys/Burke's Outlet store. Additionally, the garden center and auto bays were leased to a Merchant's Tire location. Considerable square footage was also relinquished to form a sizable extension of the mall corridor.

A basic small-town Penney, the Elizabeth City location contained fewer frills than its cross-mall rival, with apparel, bed, bath, shoe and kitchenware selections considerably more sparse, its only advantage an in-store salon.

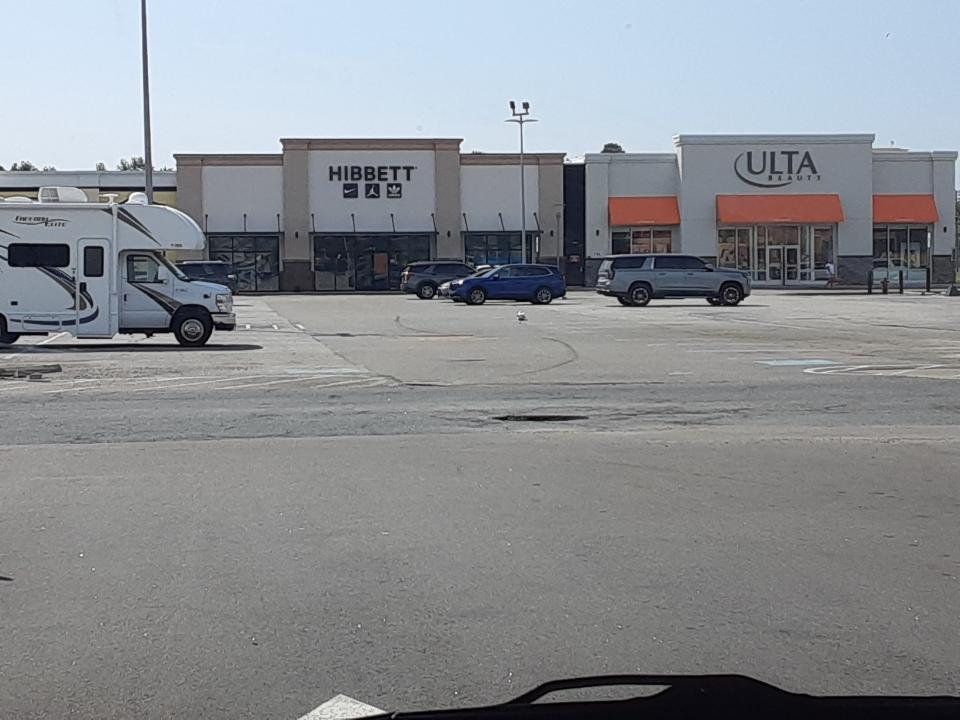
April 21, 2025 photo of the Ulta Beauty and Hibbett Sports buildings on Southgate Park occupying the site of the former Southgate Mall anchor that was originally a W.T. Grant, then Roses and finally JCPenney before its 2015 closure and 2017 demolition

The location joined 39 other under-performing JCPenney locations slated for closure by April 2015 and was demolished in 2017; with part of the space previously occupied now taken by a new building that houses the Hibbett Sports location previously in the interior of the mall as well as an Ulta Beauty location.

== Junior anchors ==
- Bealls (19,988 sq ft (1,857 m^{2})), 1 floor.
  - (Formerly Winn-Dixie/JCPenney/Rose's Express 19,988 sq. ft., Goody's 27,597 sq. ft., and Burke's Outlet, 1 floor.)

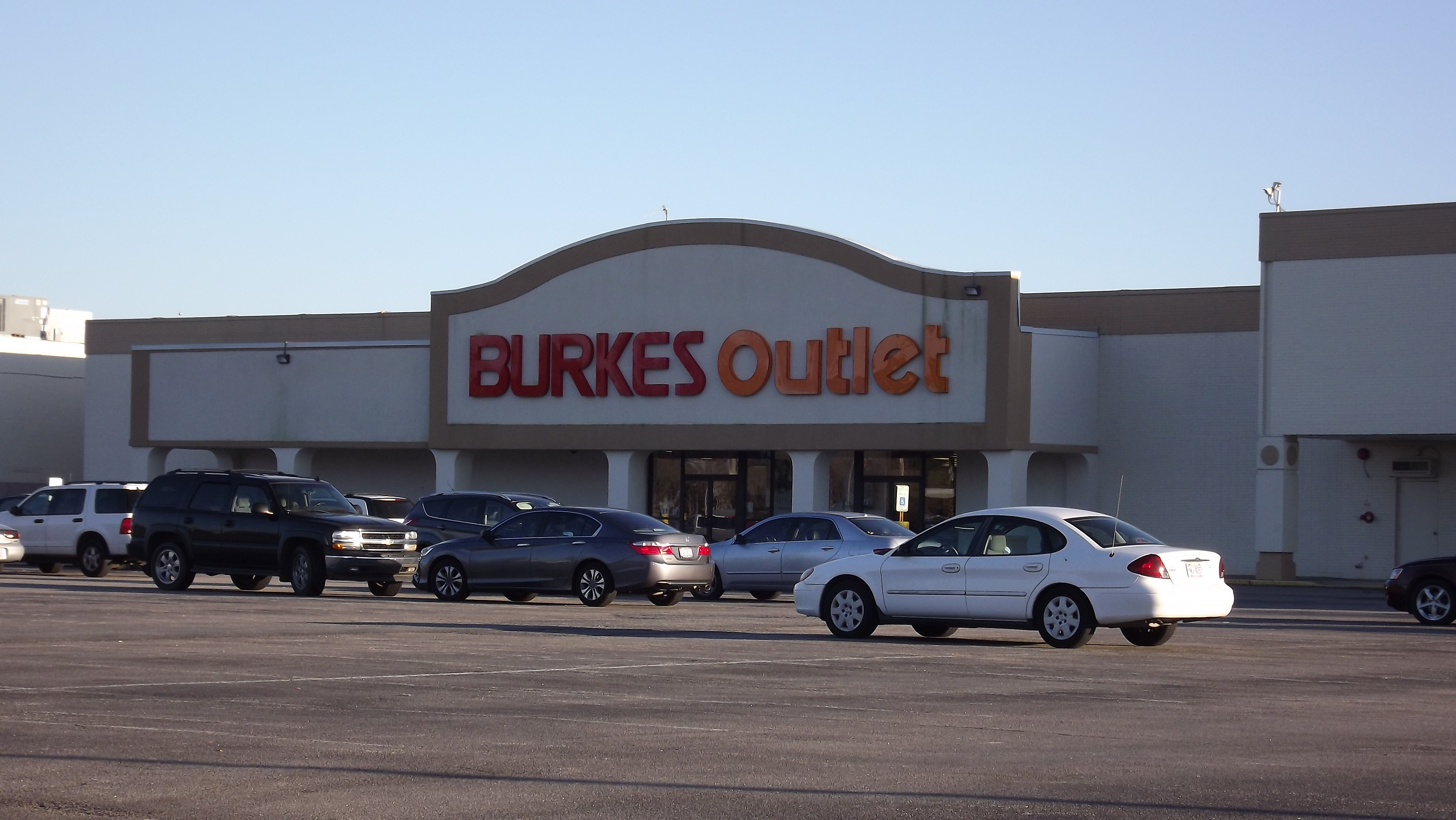
West junior anchor of Southgate Mall. Original tenant Winn-Dixie 1969–1985; JCPenney from 1985–1996; Roses Express from 2002–2003; Goody's from 2005–2009; Burke's Outlet from 2011 to present.

Junior anchor Winn-Dixie originally occupied this space from the mall's 1969 inception, filling a crucial grocery niche, a then-common 'well-rounded' approach in many early malls, often complemented by a variety chain as Woolworth's. The supermarket departed the mall in 1985 for an off-site location, and was immediately replaced by JCPenney which relocated from downtown Elizabeth City.

In 1996 JCPenney moved a second time to the 1993-vacated Rose's location, leaving the location vacant until 2002 when a short-lived Rose's Express store was established which then vacated the following year in 2003. The space was again unoccupied for two years until 2005 when Goody's moved in, occupying the location until the chain's bankrupt demise in 2009. The space has since been occupied by Burke's Outlet since February 2011, and was renamed Bealls in 2023.

- Five Below (12,760 sq ft (1,185 m^{2})), 1 floor.
  - (Formerly People's Drug/Revco/CVS/Dragon Buffet 12,760 sq. ft., 1 floor.)

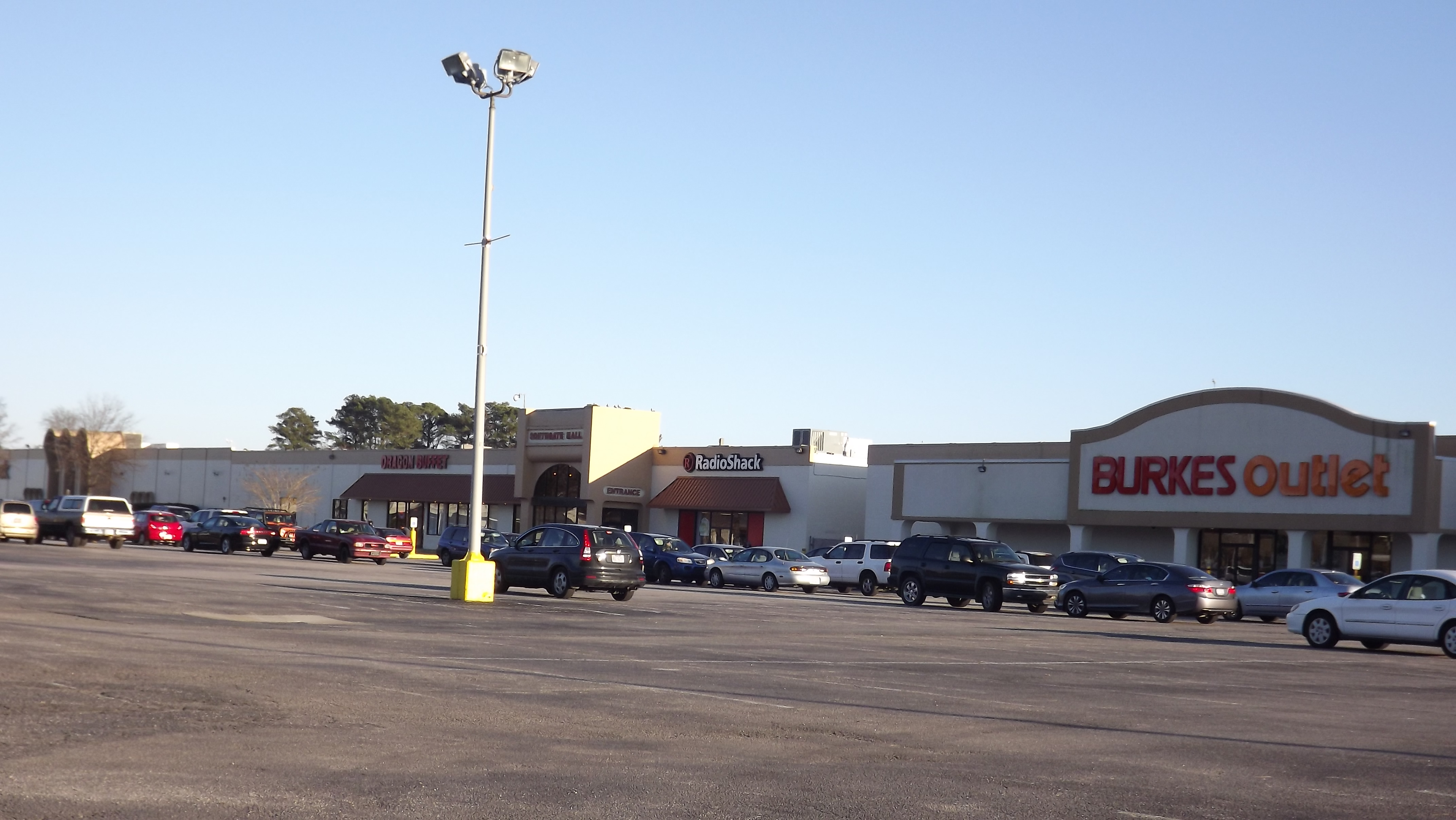
East junior anchor of Southgate Mall. Original tenant People's Drug/Revco/CVS 1969–2003; Dragon Buffet from 2003 to present.

The other original junior anchor, People's Drug was acquired by and converted to Revco in 1994. Acquisition of Revco by CVS in 1998 led to retention of the location until relocation in 2003 to a free-standing off-mall location, leaving the mall without a drug store for the first time since its opening.

The store was most notable for retaining its original 1960's layout, flooring and high ceilings throughout the People's Drug-Revco-CVS reign with only minimal maintenance, such as repainting. In some cases, some features such as departmental signage were never updated. A locally owned Chinese restaurant and existing mall tenant, Dragon Buffet, immediately relocated from the former Roses cafeteria location adjacent to JCPenney. Extensive conversion of the former drug store to an operational restaurant was completed in late 2003. Aside from the main buffet, the restaurant has three auxiliary entrances, one as a take-out counter, the second was a short-lived Japanese restaurant that as of a mid-2016 refurbishment was reintegrated into the main buffet dining area, and the third opens out into the mall corridor.

In July 2022; it was announced that Dragon Buffet had closed its doors. In 2023, it was announced that Five Below would move into the former Dragon Buffett space.

== Future ==
In an email from June 10, 2017; the mall's owners Vireo Group (which purchased the mall in February 2017 for $2.3 million ) announced plans to demolish the former JCPenney and Merchant's Tire locations, along with an abandoned Kangaroo Express gas station, as part of a planned conversion from an indoor mall (often called "demalling") into a partially open shopping venue.

On October 22, 2017; Elizabeth City's Daily Advance newspaper reported that remodeling plans as part of the proposed "demalling" would result in three other tenants, Hibbett Sports; GNC and Greensboro-based jeweler Saslow's Jewelers would move from the rear of the mall to the front, with a separate report and a map of the proposed changes in the article showing The Shoe Department also moving from the back to the space vacated when RadioShack closed as part of a recent string of closings in April 2017. The article also notes that owner Vireo Group has plans to rename the property "Elizabeth City Centre", though a member of the ownership group noted that name change had not occur until late in the year; and as of March 2018 no change in name has taken place. As of August 2018 it is now known as Southgate Park. Southgate Mall (1969-2018), Southgate Park (2018-present)
