= 2006 Pepsi 400 =

Race details
- Race 17 of 36 in the 2006 NASCAR Nextel Cup Series
- 2006 Pepsi 400 program cover
- Date: July 1, 2006
- Location: Daytona International Speedway in Daytona Beach, Florida
- Course: Permanent racing facility
- Course length: 2.5 miles (4.02 km)
- Distance: 160 laps, 400 mi (643.27 km)
- Weather: Mild with temperatures approaching 71.6 °F (22.0 °C); wind speeds up to 13 miles per hour (21 km/h)
- Average speed: 153.143 miles per hour (246.460 km/h)
- Attendance: 150,000

Pole position
Driver	Boris Said	No Fear Racing
- Time: 48.350

Most laps led
Driver	Tony Stewart	Joe Gibbs Racing
- Laps: 86

Winner
No. 20	Tony Stewart	Joe Gibbs Racing

Television in the United States
- Network: Fox
- Announcers: Mike Joy, Larry McReynolds, Darrell Waltrip
- Nielsen ratings: 4.7

The 2006 Pepsi 400 was a NASCAR Nextel Cup Series event held on July 1, 2006, at Daytona International Speedway in Daytona Beach, Florida. Tony Stewart, driver of No. 20 Joe Gibbs Racing Chevrolet, won the race after starting 2nd to Boris Said, and led 86 of the 160 laps. Actor Brandon Routh was the grand marshal.

== Qualifying ==
Pos	No.	Driver	Make	Speed	Time	Behind
1	60	Boris Said	Ford	186.143	48.350	0.000
2	20	Tony Stewart	Chevrolet	185.651	48.478	-0.128
3	40	David Stremme	Dodge	185.579	48.497	-0.147
4	24	Jeff Gordon	Chevrolet	185.506	48.516	-0.166
5	01	Joe Nemechek	Chevrolet	185.464	48.527	-0.177
6	11	Denny Hamlin	Chevrolet	185.460	48.528	-0.178
7	88	Dale Jarrett	Ford	185.441	48.533	-0.183
8	1	Martin Truex Jr.	Chevrolet	185.086	48.626	-0.276
9	48	Jimmie Johnson	Chevrolet	185.082	48.627	-0.277
10	17	Matt Kenseth	Ford	185.006	48.647	-0.297
11	18	J. J. Yeley	Chevrolet	184.854	48.687	-0.337
12	16	Greg Biffle	Ford	184.782	48.706	-0.356
13	38	Elliott Sadler	Ford	184.782	48.706	-0.356
14	5	Kyle Busch	Chevrolet	184.714	48.724	-0.374
15	32	Travis Kvapil	Chevrolet	184.650	48.741	-0.391
16	2	Kurt Busch	Dodge	184.494	48.782	-0.432
17	25	Brian Vickers	Chevrolet	184.328	48.826	-0.476
18	09	Mike Wallace	Ford	184.253	48.846	-0.496
19	55	Michael Waltrip	Dodge	184.147	48.874	-0.524
20	14	Sterling Marlin	Chevrolet	184.136	48.877	-0.527
21	96	Tony Raines	Chevrolet	184.015	48.909	-0.559
22	00	Hermie Sadler	Ford	184.004	48.912	-0.562
23	12	Ryan Newman	Dodge	183.981	48.918	-0.568
24	6	Mark Martin	Ford	183.974	48.920	-0.570
25	7	Robby Gordon	Chevrolet	183.963	48.923	-0.573
26	26	Jamie McMurray	Ford	183.951	48.926	-0.576
27	27	Kirk Shelmerdine	Chevrolet	183.861	48.950	-0.600
28	10	Scott Riggs	Dodge	183.767	48.975	-0.625
29	99	Carl Edwards	Ford	183.580	49.025	-0.675
30	07	Clint Bowyer	Chevrolet	183.580	49.025	-0.675
31	21	Ken Schrader	Ford	183.572	49.027	-0.677
32	29	Kevin Harvick	Chevrolet	183.456	49.058	-0.708
33	45	Kyle Petty	Dodge	183.441	49.062	-0.712
34	43	Bobby Labonte	Dodge	183.359	49.084	-0.734
35	8	Dale Earnhardt Jr.	Chevrolet	183.322	49.094	-0.744
36	66	Jeff Green	Chevrolet	182.741	49.250	-0.900
37	41	Reed Sorenson	Dodge	182.704	49.260	-0.910
38	9	Kasey Kahne	Dodge	182.622	49.282	-0.932
39	31	Jeff Burton	Chevrolet	182.596	49.289	-0.939
40	42	Casey Mears	Dodge	182.009	49.448	-1.098
41	22	Dave Blaney	Dodge	181.855	49.490	-1.140
42	19	Jeremy Mayfield	Dodge	181.594	49.561	-1.211
43	61	Chad Chaffin	Chevrolet	183.554	49.032	-0.682
Failed to qualify
44	4	Scott Wimmer	Chevrolet			
45	49	Kevin Lepage	Dodge			
46	78	Kenny Wallace	Chevrolet			
47	34	Chad Blount	Dodge			
48	72	Kertus Davis	Dodge			

== Race summary ==
The race began at 8:18 p.m. with Stewart passing Said to lead the first lap. The first seven laps were run caution-free before a beach ball was found on the back straightaway. On lap 16, Jeff Burton and Casey Mears, who had had a previous incident in an earlier practice session, made contact, spinning Burton out and bringing out the caution. By the time the green flag was waved again on lap 21, Jeff Gordon had assumed the lead. Gordon continued to lead until lap 33, when he was passed by Stewart who led the race until the caution came back out for debris. Most of the leaders came to pit road; however, Dale Earnhardt Jr. did not, and thus took the lead from Stewart. Stewart would not lead again until lap 111, when he took the lead from Matt Kenseth. On lap 148, Jimmie Johnson and Bobby Labonte crashed, ending Labonte's race. Said stayed out of the pits on lap 150, giving him the lead. With six laps remaining, Gordon was involved in a crash with Greg Biffle, J. J. Yeley, and Mark Martin, bringing out the caution for the final time. Said led the field back to the green flag with three laps remaining, but was passed by Stewart on the next lap. Stewart would subsequently win the race, his second consecutive Pepsi 400 win after winning the race in 2005 as well.

== Race results ==
Pos	Car	Driver	Team	Make	Sponsor
1	20	Tony Stewart	Joe Gibbs Racing	Chevrolet	The Home Depot
2	5	Kyle Busch	Hendrick Motorsports	Chevrolet	Kellogg's / Cheez-it
3	2	Kurt Busch	Penske Racing	Dodge	Miller Lite
4	60	Boris Said	No Fear Racing	Ford	SoBe - No Fear
5	17	Matt Kenseth	Roush Racing	Ford	R+L Carriers
6	38	Elliott Sadler	Robert Yates Racing	Ford	M&M's
7	42	Casey Mears	Chip Ganassi Racing	Dodge	Texaco / Havoline
8	26	Jamie McMurray	Roush Racing	Ford	Smirnoff Ice
9	29	Kevin Harvick	Richard Childress Racing	Chevrolet	Hershey's
10	07	Clint Bowyer	Richard Childress Racing	Chevrolet	Jack Daniel's
11	12	Ryan Newman	Penske Racing	Dodge	Alltell
12	21	Ken Schrader	Wood Brothers Racing	Ford	U.S. Air Force Special Operations
13	8	Dale Earnhardt Jr.	Dale Earnhardt, Inc.	Chevrolet	Budweiser
14	7	Robby Gordon	Robby Gordon Motorsports	Ford	Harrah's
15	31	Jeff Burton	Richard Childress Racing	Chevrolet	Cingular Wireless
16	40	David Stremme	Chip Ganassi Racing	Dodge	Coors Light
17	11	Denny Hamlin	Joe Gibbs Racing	Chevrolet	FedEx Home Delivery
18	25	Brian Vickers	Hendrick Motorsports	Chevrolet	GMAC
19	01	Joe Nemechek	MB2 Motorsports	Chevrolet	U.S. Army
20	10	Scott Riggs	Evernham Motorsports	Dodge	Stanley Tools / Valvoline
21	96	Tony Raines	Hall of Fame Racing	Chevrolet	DLP-HDTV
22	88	Dale Jarrett	Robert Yates Racing	Ford	UPS
23	09	Mike Wallace	Phoenix Racing	Ford	Miccosukee Resort & Gaming
24	14	Sterling Marlin	MB2 Motorsports	Chevrolet	Ginn Clubs & Resorts
25	9	Kasey Kahne	Evernham Motorsports	Dodge	Dodge Dealers / UAW
26	66	Jeff Green	Haas CNC Racing	Chevrolet	Best Buy
27	22	Dave Blaney	Bill Davis Racing	Dodge	Caterpillar
28	45	Kyle Petty	Petty Enterprises	Dodge	Tire Kingdom
29	1	Martin Truex Jr.	Dale Earnhardt, Inc.	Chevrolet	Bass Pro Shops / Tracker
30	32	Travis Kvapil	PPI Motorsports	Chevrolet	Tide
31	16	Greg Biffle	Roush Racing	Ford	Subway / National Guard
32	48	Jimmie Johnson	Hendrick Motorsports	Chevrolet	Lowe's
33	6	Mark Martin	Roush Racing	Ford	AAA
34	41	Reed Sorenson	Chip Ganassi Racing	Dodge	Target
35	61	Chad Chaffin	Front Row Motorsports	Chevrolet	Taco Bell
36	19	Jeremy Mayfield	Evernham Motorsports	Dodge	Dodge Dealers / UAW
37	18	J. J. Yeley	Joe Gibbs Racing	Chevrolet	Interstate Batteries
38	55	Michael Waltrip	Waltrip-Jasper Racing	Dodge	NAPA Auto Parts
39	99	Carl Edwards	Roush Racing	Ford	Office Depot
40	24	Jeff Gordon	Hendrick Motorsports	Chevrolet	DuPont / Pepsi / Superman Returns
41	00	Hermie Sadler	MBA Racing	Ford	Aaron's
42	43	Bobby Labonte	Petty Enterprises	Dodge	Pillsbury / Cinnabon
43	27	Kirk Shelmerdine	Kirk Shelmerdine Racing	Chevrolet	Catdaddy Carolina Moonshine

== Standings after the race ==
Pos	Driver	Points
1	Jimmie Johnson	2501
2	Matt Kenseth	2493
3	Dale Earnhardt Jr.	2234
4	Kasey Kahne	2209
5	Tony Stewart	2202
6	Mark Martin	2177
7	Jeff Burton	2152
8	Kyle Busch	2095
9	Kevin Harvick	2088
10	Denny Hamlin	2048

Previous race: 2006 Dodge/Save Mart 350	Nextel Cup Series; 2006 season	Next race: 2006 USG Sheetrock 400
