= National Tire Wholesale =

Floridian tile distributor

National Tire Wholesale (NTW)
- Company type: Limited liability company
- Founded: April 5, 2018; 6 years ago
- Headquarters: Palm Beach Gardens, Florida
- Products: Automotive tires and equipment
- Parent: TBC Corporation (2018–present)
- Website: www.ntw.com

National Tire Wholesale is a wholesale tire distributor created from a joint venture. The company is headquartered in Palm Beach Gardens, Florida.

== History ==
January 3, 2018, Michelin North America and Sumitomo Corporation of America announced a definitive agreement to combine their respective North American replacement tire distribution and related service operations in a 50-50 joint venture. On April 5, 2018, the joint venture officially closed, bringing together Michelin North America's Tire Centers and Sumitomo Corporation of Americas' (TBC Corporation) Carroll Tire, owned by TBC Corporation. The combined wholesale unit operates under NTW.

== Company operations ==
NTW is a wholly owned subsidiary of TBC Corporation through a multi-channel strategy owned by Michelin North America and Sumitomo Corporation of America.
