= Western Auto =

Auto parts retail chain in US

Western Auto Supply Company
- Type: Subsidiary
- Industry: Auto parts retail chain
- Founded: 1909; 117 years ago
- Founder: George Pepperdine, Don Abnor Davis
- Defunct: 2003; 23 years ago as brand
- Successor: Advance Auto Parts
- Headquarters: Kansas City, Missouri, United States
- Products: automobile parts, firearms, tires, bicycles, lawn mowers, home appliances
- Services: Automotive repair
- Parent: Beneficial Finance (1961–1985); Wesray Capital (1985–1988); Sears (1988–1998); Advance Auto Parts (1998–2003)
- Website: Official website (archived)

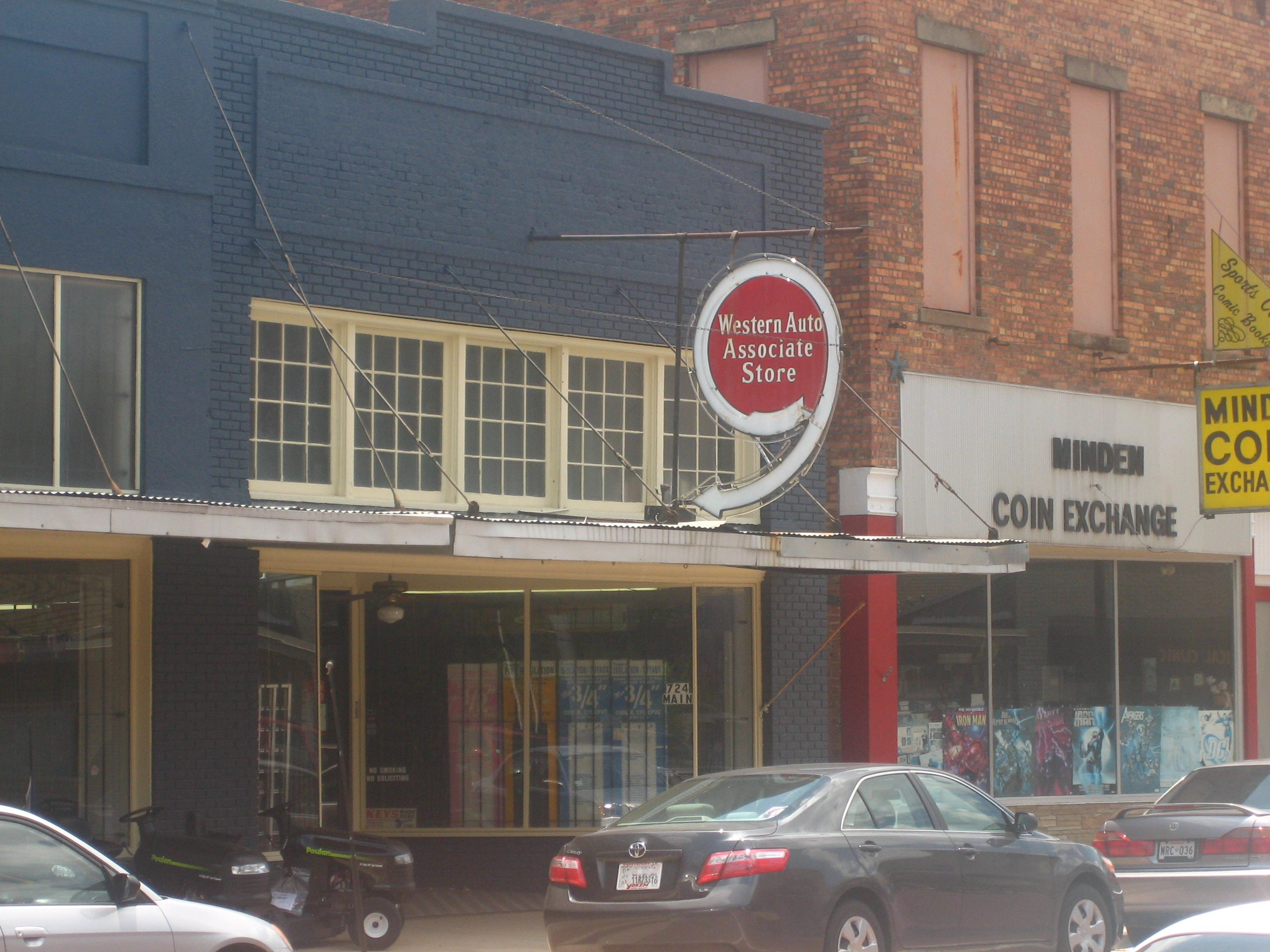
A sign for a Western Auto Associate Store in Minden, Louisiana

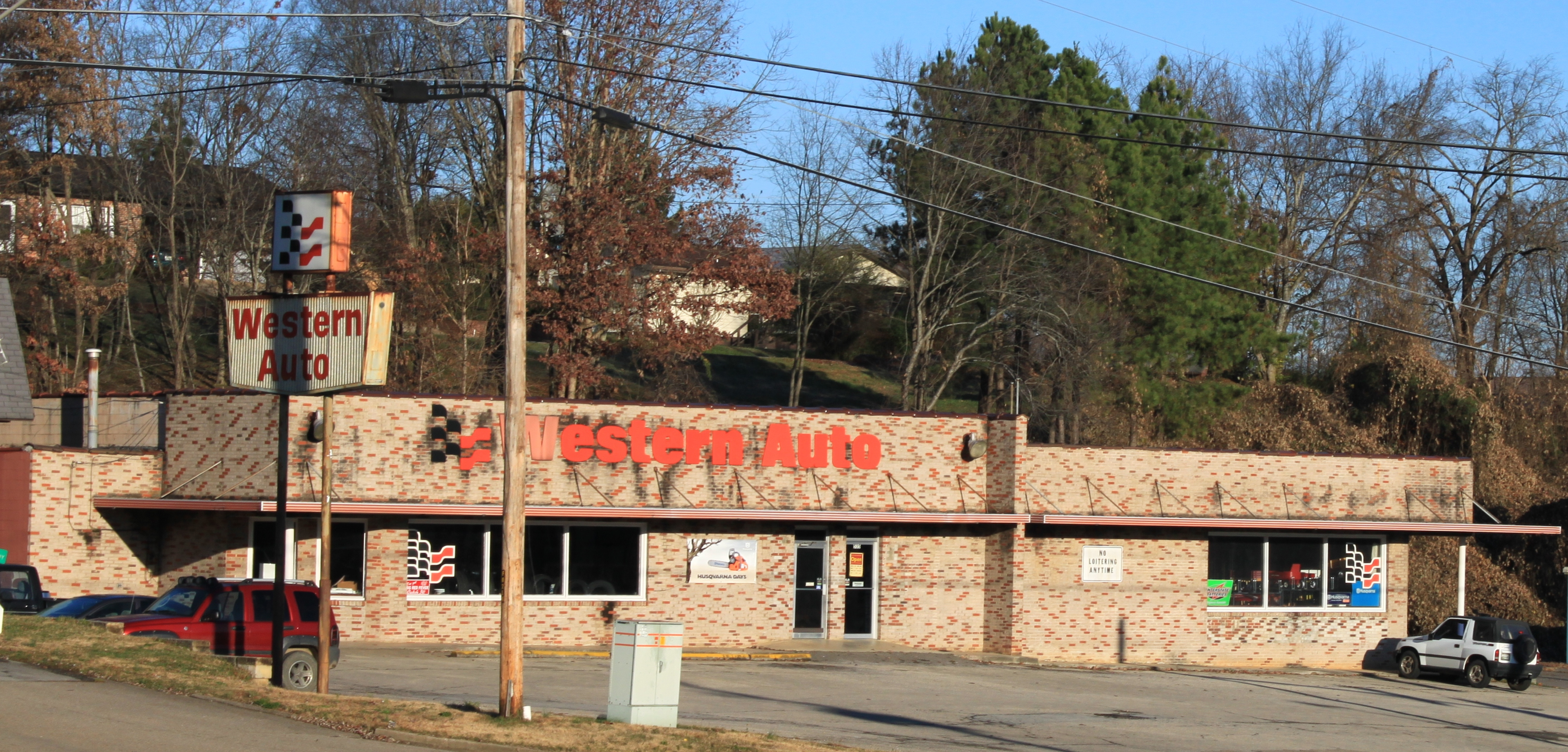
Remaining Western Auto store, Newport, Tennessee

Western Auto Supply Company—known more widely as Western Auto—was a specialty retail chain of stores that supplied automobile parts and accessories operating approximately 1,200 stores across the United States. Started in 1909 in Kansas City, Missouri, by George Pepperdine and Don Abnor Davis, Pepperdine would later found Pepperdine University. Western Auto was purchased by Beneficial Corporation in 1961; Western Auto's management led a leveraged buyout in 1985, leading three years later to a sale to Sears. Sears sold most of the company to Advance Auto Parts in 1998, and by 2003, the resulting merger had led to the end of the Western Auto brand and its product distribution network. After the demise of Western Auto, the company's corporate headquarters at 2107 Grand Boulevard in Kansas City, Missouri, was transformed into loft condominiums, the Western Auto sign remaining atop the building. The sign was relit in July 13, 2018.

== History ==
Western Auto originally started as a mail order business for replacement auto parts. The first retail store was established in 1921, and grew quickly as automobiles became increasingly more common. At one point, there were over 1,200 company-owned stores nationwide, usually located in metropolitan areas, and more than 4,000 associate stores (private, franchised, "dealer" locations), usually located in small towns. The associate store program was the first of its type, pioneering the way for modern day franchise operations. The company had five regional distribution centers in the United States, with the North Carolina center serving stores in Puerto Rico.

In addition to the auto parts stores, Western also owned two middle-sized tire store chains, a mobile radio maker called Midland International, and Eva Gabor International Ltd., a wig supplier. (source: LA Times)

=== Private labelling ===
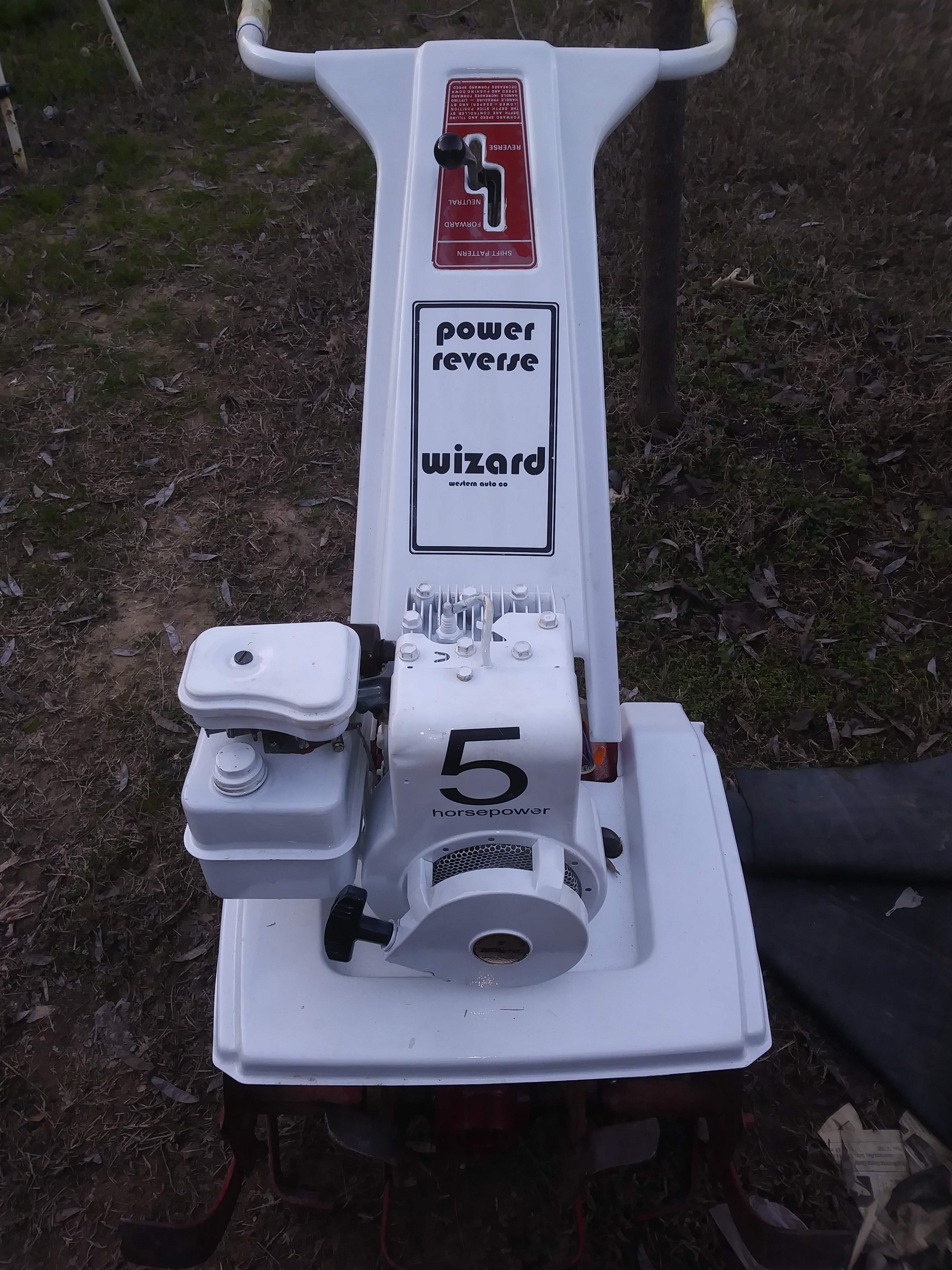
1975 Western Auto Garden Tiller

Western Auto was known for its private labelled Western Flyer Bicycle and Performance Radial GT tire brand. Other Western Auto private-labeled brands included Davis tires, Tough One batteries, TrueTone electronics, Citation appliances, Wizard tools, and Wizard typewriters—the latter as re-branded typewriters manufactured by Brother Industries of Nagoya, Japan. Western Auto was also the parent company of Auto America and Parts America stores, and acquired National Tire Warehouse (NTW) stores. They also used the Wizard name on outdoor equipment including lawn mowers, tillers, outboard engines and boats for a short time, along with automotive parts such as batteries and tires.

=== Firearm sales ===
Sometime in the 1940s or 1950s, Western Auto started selling rifles and shotguns in its catalogues. As with other chains at the time, such as Sears, Roebuck and Co., Montgomery Ward, and J.C. Penney, Western Auto's firearms were sold under a proprietary brand name. Often called "store brand" firearms, they were produced by reputable name brand manufacturers, such as O.F. Mossberg & Sons, Remington Arms, Savage Arms, Winchester Repeating Arms Company, and High Standard Manufacturing Company. Western Auto firearms sold under the "Revelation" brand name, and were generally models from the brands Savage, Marlin Firearms, or Mossberg.

Other than markings, Revelation models were identical to standard production models. They were the most basic models produced by the various manufacturers, and featured plain birch or walnut stocks. However, metal bluing remained good and nearly all models were provided with iron sights and mounting provisions for scopes. Once valued lower than "name brand" equivalents, store-brand rifles, shotguns, and revolvers have essentially reached price parity with their more universal counterparts. Firearms were one of many lines added to the store in a product diversification effort. By the end of the 1950s Western Auto was similar to a Sears store, equipped with a catalog order center. Auto parts comprised a small percentage of the company's sales by the mid-1960s, and had nearly disappeared by the 1970s.

=== Beneficial ===
In 1961, Western Auto was sold to the Beneficial Finance Corporation. Beneficial retained ownership until 1985, when the company was purchased in a leveraged buyout led by Western Auto management and Wesray Capital Corporation.

=== Streamlining business operations ===
In the early 1980s, in response to the success of Walmart, Western Auto Retail converted all of the company-owned stores to what it called "FLAG" stores, which sold exclusively automotive parts and accessories. These stores were largely located in more urbanized areas much like their successors today. Western Auto Wholesale strongly urged its associate stores to become at least 50% automotive, but most refused because the customer base of their locations, in "small town America", demanded a wider range of merchandise. This disagreement by the associate stores would later save the company.

In February 1986, Western Auto purchased 40 White Stores in Texas from Canadian Tire for US$24.5 million. In February 1987, Western Auto purchased Wheeling, West Virginia-based Tire America. In October of that year, it purchased Dale City, Virginia-based National Tire Warehouse.

=== Sears Roebuck & Co. purchase ===
In 1988, Sears Roebuck purchased Western Auto from Wesray Capital.

In 1995, Western Auto acquired 84 auto parts stores in Ohio, Indiana, Kentucky, West Virginia and Tennessee from the bankrupted Nationwise Automotive chain for an undisclosed amount and later acquired Wheels Discount Auto Supply and its 82 auto parts stores in New York and Pennsylvania from its then owner Fay's Drug for $37 million.

Also during 1995, Sears began to convert the Western Auto stores to the new parts-only Parts America format by eliminating the automotive service bays. By 1998, Sears had almost finished converting the 600 remaining company owned Western Auto stores into Parts America branded stores.

By the beginning of 1997, fewer than 850 company-owned stores remained. At that point, the associate stores were the main stores of the company, with their more diversified name-brand lines including appliances, electronics, hardware, typewriters, bicycles, go-karts and outdoor equipment/parts, and their reach into small-town America. Sears removed National Tire Warehouse and Tire America from Western Auto to form a new company called National Tire and Battery, which Sears kept until 2003.

From 1991 until the end of the 1997 season, Western Auto sponsored NASCAR Hall of Fame driver Darrell Waltrip's Winston Cup race team. The specialty retailer also sponsored Al Hofmann's Funny Car in NHRA from 1994 to 1997.

=== Advance Auto Parts merger ===
After weeks of speculation in 1998, parent company Sears sold what remained of Western Auto to Advance Auto Parts of Roanoke, Virginia. The business deal was not what experts in the after-market automotive industry expected. Specifically in return, Sears Roebuck became "one of the largest shareholders" after obtaining a 40% stake in Advance Auto Parts, and by merging their two store networks, which included Western Auto's wholesale and retail operations. More precisely, the existing store network of Advance Auto Parts, comprising 915 stores in 17 U.S. states, merged with 590 U.S.-based Parts America Stores in addition to 40 Western Auto stores in the Commonwealth of Puerto Rico.

The merger between Western Auto and Advance Auto substantially expanded Advance's network to over 1,500 retail stores in 36 states. Additionally, Sears Roebuck received a cash payment of 175 million US$, while Advance Auto's investors provided a further 70 million US$ directly to Advance. Freeman Spogli & Co. organized an investment fund that was among the group of investors that provided Advance with the $70 million cash infusion. Despite the 40% acquisition by Sears Roebuck, both companies maintained their Standard & Poor's "single-'B'-plus corporate credit rating". Analysts continued to speculate on the "financial flexibility" of Advance Auto at the time expecting the company to "take advantage of other opportunistic acquisitions".

A few of the associate stores converted to Sears Dealer stores. The remainder of the company-owned stores, located primarily in the eastern United States, were then converted into Advance stores. The remaining associate stores were promised a great and long future in the tradition of Western Auto, a promise that was not kept. Advance gave little support to the associate store operation and as a result most dealers found themselves purchasing 70%+ of their merchandise from other suppliers and simply using the Western Auto name.

== Demise of the Western Auto distribution network ==
In October 2003, Advance Auto notified the Western Auto Supply Company that by January 2004 it "would no longer supply merchandise and services to the stores in its distribution network". This decision brought an end to the Western Auto brand name after nearly a century in business. Some Western Auto store owners knew that such a decision by Advance Auto was inevitable after noticing "a trend of discontinued brands, lack of computer point-of-sale system updates, and shipments of fewer and fewer types of merchandise". Advance Auto Parts' spokesman, Shelia Stuewe, speaking on the matter stated "that the logistics of distributing appliances, home and garden supplies, auto parts and hardware to over 300 independent dealers scattered across 33 states became too much for the company to continue."

=== Use of Western Auto name ===
Dealer stores were permitted by Advance Auto Parts a license to use the Western Auto name until 2006. After 2006, stores were to cease using the Western Auto name, but many stores continue to use the name. At this time, no storefront is licensed to use the name Western Auto or fly the Western Auto sign. Advance Auto Parts remains the owner of the registered trademarks and name "Western Auto" and enforces infringements on the name, but it is unknown if they have future plans for the name. Advance also owns the name Western Auto Supply Company which is registered in Virginia.

The Western Auto name was used by Advance Auto Parts in the Commonwealth of Puerto Rico and the Virgin Islands, where it was the largest such chain, until 2006 when the last company-owned store in St. Croix was closed. All of the other stores in the division were gradually converted to Advance stores.

== See also ==
- Western Auto Building
- Western Auto 200
- List of defunct retailers of the United States
