= Tuffy Auto Service Centers =

Vehicular repair franchise in the eastern United States

Tuffy Tire & Auto Service Centers
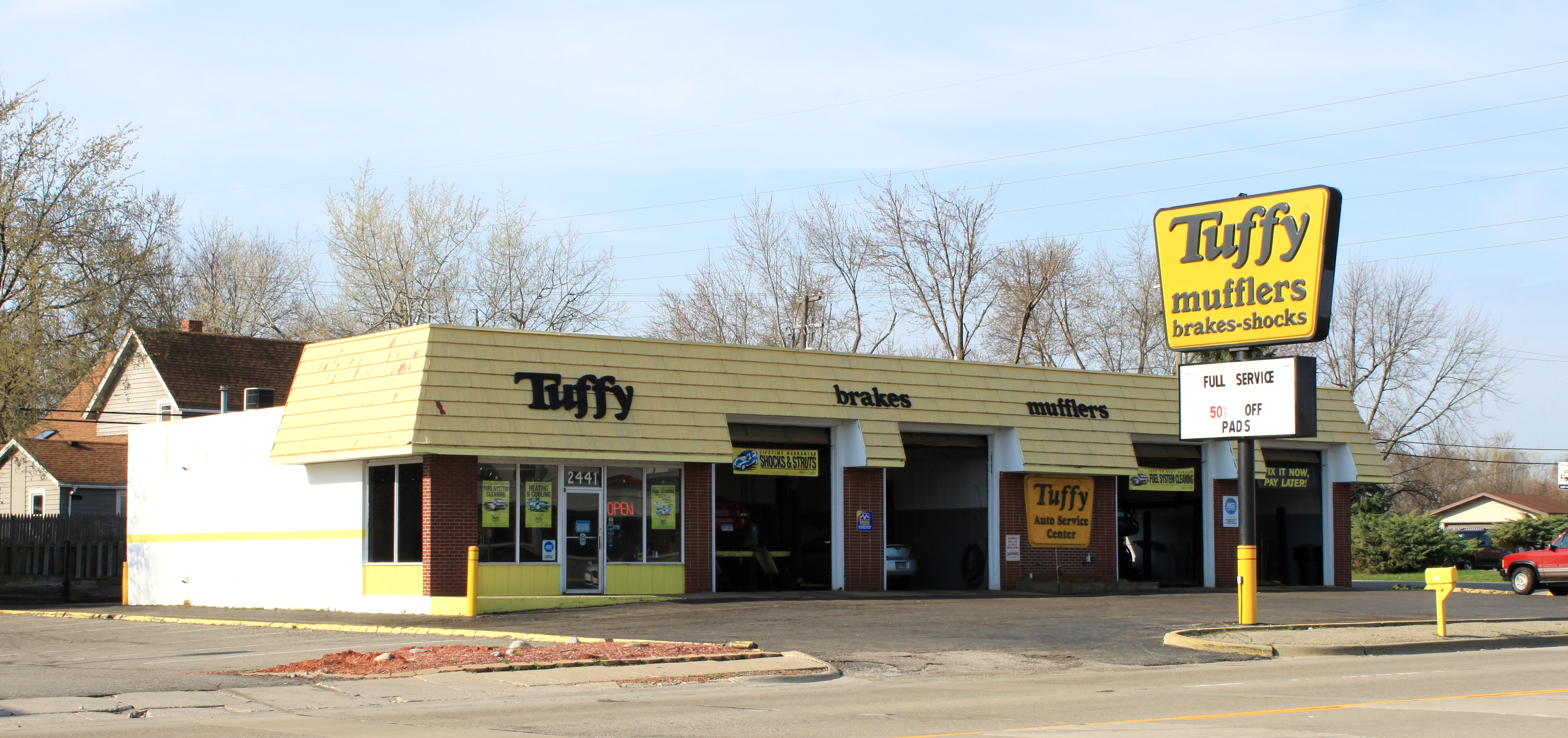
- Type: Private
- Founded: 1970
- Founders: Warren L Jones, Rene F. Campeau
- Headquarters: Toledo, Ohio, Detroit, MI
- Number of locations: 175
- Parent: Tuffy Associates Corp. (1970-2021); Mavis Tire Express Services Corp (2021-Present)
- Website: www.tuffy.com

Tuffy Tire & Auto Service Centers is a chain of franchise and company-owned automotive service centers headquartered in Toledo, Ohio. As of March 2018 there were 175 locations in 20 states in the eastern United States.The company is owned by the Tuffy Associates Corporation until 2021 when Mavis Tire, Inc. purchased the franchise. Tuffy was founded in 1970 by former Midas franchisees including Rene F. Campeau, but later diversified into complete automotive repair and tire service centers.
