= Western Flyer (bicycle company) =

Former American bicycle brand (1931-1998)

Western Flyer (brand/trademark)
- Founded: 1909
- Fate: trademark cancelled; products still in-use/collectables
- Products: bicycles, tricycles, scooters, play wagons, pedal tractors and cars
- Footnotes / references (not a company, see Western Auto)

Western Flyer was an American private label brand of bicycles, tricycles, scooters, play wagons, and pedal cars and tractors, and roller skates, sold by the former Western Auto stores. The trademark brand was first used in June 1931, and the brand of bicycles was sold until 1998. Western Auto had other companies manufacture the bicycles.

== History ==
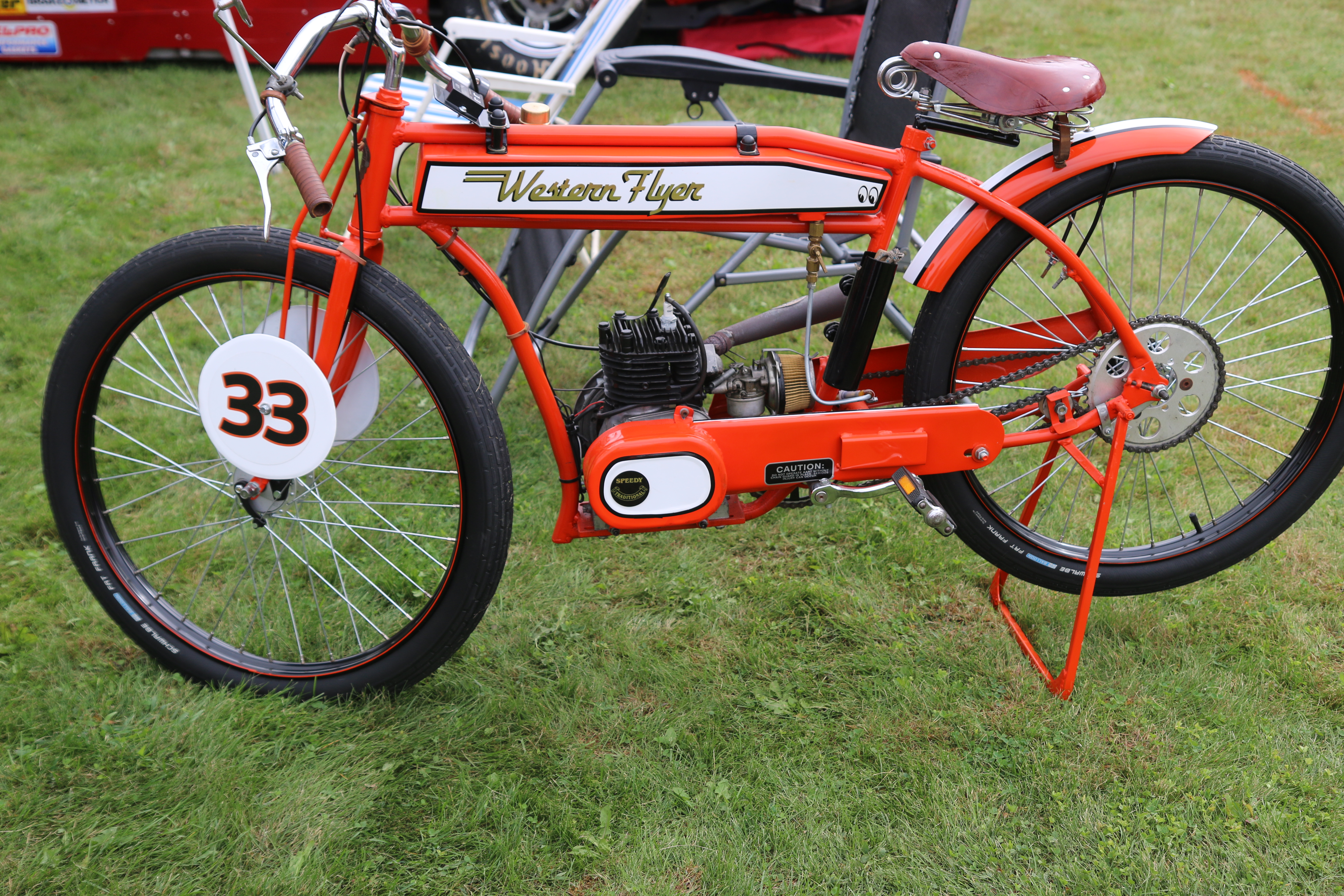
Antique Western Flyer with a motor installed

Mail order supplier / auto parts store Western Auto had several companies manufacture bicycles including Shelby, Cleveland Welding, Huffy, Murray and more. Western Auto advertised dozens of Western Flyer models; features on later models included front brakes, three-speed gears, luggage racks, and chrome springs. The bicycles were sold and advertised through Western Auto stores and advertising brochures.

== "Reproduction-style" (Repop) models ==
Columbia Manufacturing Inc. also made bicycles for Western Auto. In the 1980s through 1991, Columbia made reproduction-style Columbia and Western Flyer models, similar to many and identical to none of the classic bicycle "styles" of the classic period (1930-1950) with runs of 5000 and 10000.

== Trademarks ==
The trademark for "Western Flyer" bicycles was registered by the United States Patent Office in 1931, it was last renewed in 2002, and was cancelled in 2016 (# 71317910).
