= Sumitomo Corporation =

Japanese trading company

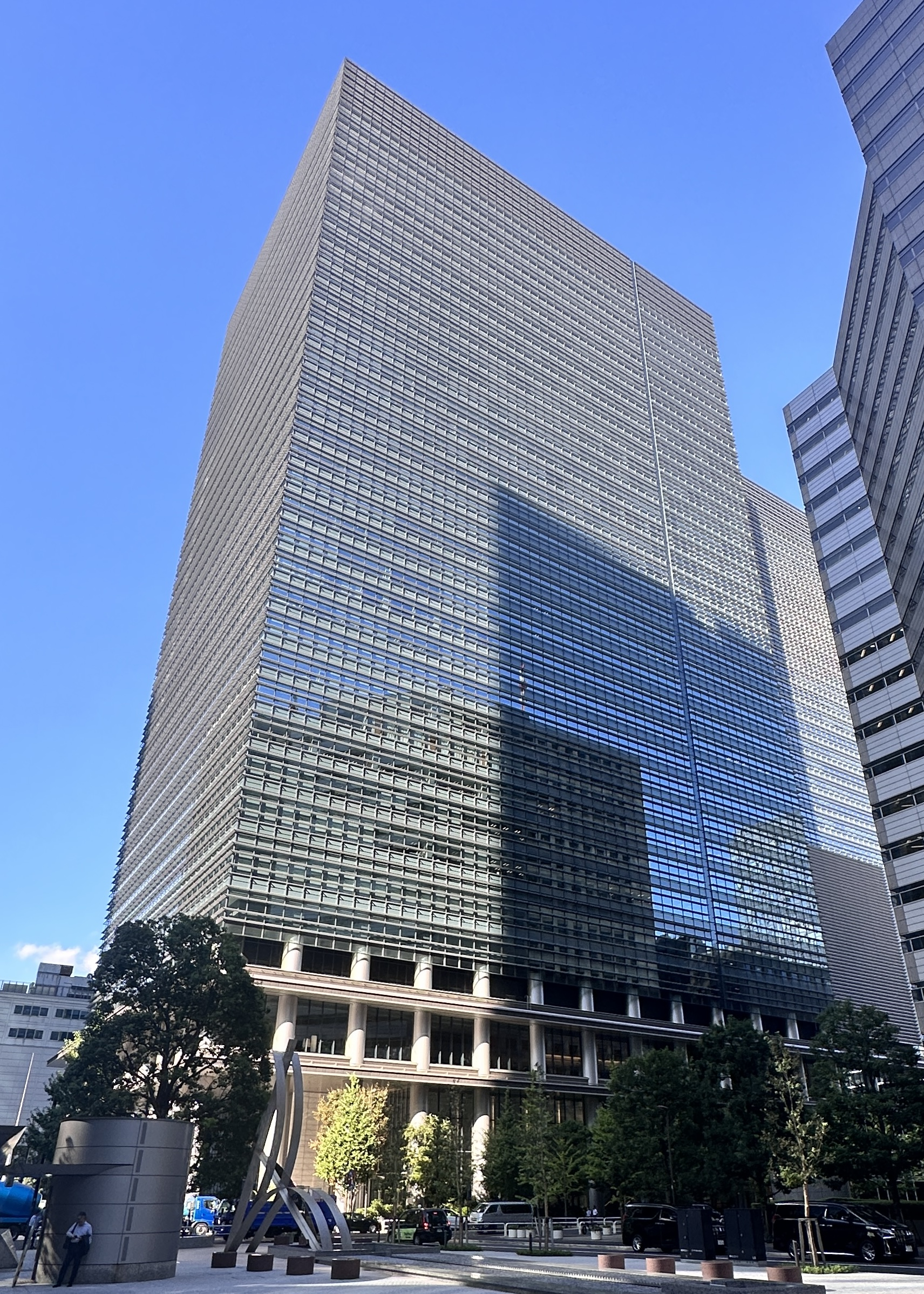
- Headquarters in Chiyoda, Tokyo
- Native name: 住友商事株式会社
- Romanized name: Sumitomo Shōji kabushiki gaisha
- Type: Public
- Traded as: TYO: 8053; NAG: 8053; FSE: 8053; Nikkei 225 component (TYO); TOPIX 100 component (TYO)
- Industry: General trading
- Founded: 24 December 1919; 106 years ago, in Osaka, Japan
- Headquarters: Otemachi Place East Tower, 2 Chome-3-1, Ōtemachi, Chiyoda, Tokyo, Japan
- Area served: Worldwide
- Key people: Kazuo Ohmori (chairman); Masayuki Hyodo (president and CEO)
- Services: Metal; Construction; Transportation; Infrastructure; Chemicals; Energy; Mineral resources Food; Consumer Goods
- Revenue: ▲$ 32.16 billion USD (FY 2013) (¥ 3,317 billion JPY) (FY 2013)
- Net income: ▼$ 2.16 billion USD (FY 2013) (¥ 220.06 billion JPY) (FY 2019)
- Number of employees: 72,642 (consolidated as of March 31, 2020)
- Subsidiaries: SCSK; TBC Corporation (50%)
- Website: Official website

Sumitomo Corporation (Japanese: 住友商事株式会社, Hepburn: Sumitomo Shōji kabushiki gaisha) is one of the largest worldwide sōgō shōsha general trading companies, and is a diversified corporation. The company was incorporated in 1919 and is a member company of the Sumitomo Group.

It is listed on three Japanese stock exchanges (Tokyo, Nagoya and Fukuoka) and is a constituent of the TOPIX and Nikkei 225 stock indices. Today, the company is one of the top three sōgō shōsha companies in the world.

== History ==
The Sumitomo Group, of which Sumitomo Corporation is a key member, dates to the 17th century establishment of a book and medicine shop in Kyoto by Masatomo Sumitomo. Sumitomo's brother-in-law Riemon Soga developed a technology to extract silver from copper, and Soga's son (who married Sumitomo's daughter) Tomomochi Sumitomo expanded this smelting business to Osaka. From this start, the Sumitomo family expanded its business into copper mining (the Besshi copper mine), followed by textiles, sugar and medicine trading.

The Sumitomo family was close to the Tokugawa shogunate throughout the Edo period. During the 1860s, this relationship became a liability for the firm as the Tokugawa clan warred with rivals in western Japan. Following the Tokugawas' defeat, Sumitomo was almost ruined and under pressure to sell the Besshi mine, which by that point was nearly unworkable. However, Sumitomo kept the mine and improved its output through adoption of new Western techniques. During the rapid westernization of Japan in ensuing decades, Sumitomo started various new trading, manufacturing and financing businesses, becoming one of the major zaibatsu of early 20th century Japan.

Sumitomo Corporation was incorporated in December 1919 as The Osaka North Harbour Co., Ltd. to engage in real estate management, land reclamation, land grading, harbor repair construction and related work in the Osaka northern harbor region. In 1944, the company merged with Sumitomo Building Co., Ltd. (established August 1923; capital stock 6.5 million yen) to form Sumitomo Building and Real Estate Co., Ltd.

Sumitomo was integral to Imperial Japan's war machine during World War II, but the war destroyed most of Sumitomo's industrial infrastructure within Japan. The ensuing Allied occupation led to the forced breakup of the largest Japanese companies, including Sumitomo, and transfer of Japanese industrial assets as part of reparations. Sumitomo Building transitioned to general trading, looking to handle products from Japan's major manufacturing firms in various industries, and changed its name to Nippon Engineering Co., Ltd. (Nihon Kensetsu Sangyo Kaisha), starting a new existence as a general trading firm with a sales staff of just 32 people. The firm listed its shares on the Osaka, Tokyo and Nagoya Stock Exchanges in 1949.

As regulations on large companies were relaxed in the 1950s, Nippon Engineering resumed closer relations with other Sumitomo Group companies through the "White Water Club" (Hakusui-kai), a coordinating meeting of company presidents. The company began to grow overseas in the 1950s, starting business in Mumbai in 1950 and in New York City in 1952. It changed its name to Sumitomo Shoji Kaisha, Ltd. in 1952. By the 1960s Sumitomo officially aimed to be one of the "Big Three" general trading companies, alongside Mitsubishi and Mitsui. In 1970, Sumitomo established a second head office in Tokyo and merged with Sogo Boeki Co., Ltd. Sumitomo adopted its current English name, Sumitomo Corporation, in 1978. The company's transactional volume increased by a factor of ten from 1955 to 1965, and again by a factor of ten from 1965 to 1975. Like its zaibatsu cohorts Mitsubishi and Mitsui, Sumitomo established a keiretsu business group centered on itself and Sumitomo Bank.

Sumitomo's strategy focused on natural resources through 2014, when the company booked hundreds of billions of yen in losses on tight oil (shale oil) and other energy-related investments. The company's president, Kuniharu Nakamura, attributed these losses to both adverse market factors and Sumitomo's relative inexperience in the field. As a result of these setbacks, Sumitomo was overtaken by Itochu as Japan's third-largest general trading company. Sumitomo announced in 2015 that it would refocus its business on the automotive and infrastructure industries and other non-resource businesses.

Berkshire Hathaway acquired over 5% of the stock in the company, along with four other Japanese trading houses, over the 12-month period ending in August 2020.

== Projects and investments ==
One of Sumitomo's largest investments is in the Ambatovy nickel mining project in Madagascar, where it had invested approximately $2.4 billion as of 2015 in a joint venture with Korea Resources and others.

Sumitomo is a 50% investor in SES Water, a UK water supply company, together with Osaka Gas.

Sumitomo is a major investor in the Turo car-rental service, and plans to facilitate the service's debut in Japan around 2020.

Sumitomo, along with Mitsubishi Heavy Industries, worked with the Department of Transportation of the Philippines for the rehabilitation of the MRT Line 3 in Manila from 2019 to 2021. Sumitomo previously maintained the line from 2000 to 2012, until the line was seen to be deteriorated in the following years due to poor maintenance.

Sumitomo is in a joint venture with the Japan Transport Engineering Company (J-TREC) for the production of a total of 51 commuter train sets (408 cars) in two separate contracts for the Philippine National Railways North–South Commuter Railway and the production of 30 8-car train sets (240 train cars) for the Metro Manila Subway.

Sumitomo is an investor in LRT Line 1 operator Light Rail Manila Corporation, a railway consortium composed of Metro Pacific Investments Corporation, Ayala Corporation, and Macquarie Infrastructure Holdings (Philippines) PTE Ltd. since May 2020.

== Subsidiaries and joint ventures ==
- Aimo Park
- Aimo Solution
- Bluewell Insurance
- Cantex
- Clickstream Capital
- Compañía Minera Quebrada Blanca (30% share)
- Crunchyroll SC Anime Fund (anime production joint venture with Crunchyroll)
- Fyffes
- Global Partnership for Ethiopia (27.2% share)
- GTS Rail Operations (17.5% share)
- Kiriu Corporation
- Minera Ojos del Salado (20% share)
- New Zealand Aluminium Smelters Limited (20.64% share)
- Pacific Summit Energy
- Petro Summit Pte Ltd (Singapore)
- Presidio Ventures
- SCSK
- SMBC Finance & Lease
- Sumitec International (Moscow)
- Sumitomo Chemical Company Limited
- Sumitomo Corporation Equity Asia Limited
- Sumitomo Corporation Global Commodities (London & Singapore)
- Sumitomo Forestry NZ Limited
- Summit Fresh Foods New Zealand Limited
- Sumitomo Electric Egypt
- Sumitomo Wiring Systems Ltd.
- Summit Biotech
- Summit Forests New Zealand Limited
- TBC Corporation (50% share) (Big O Tires, Midas International, LLC.)

=== Former subsidiaries and joint ventures ===
- Pet product maker Hartz Mountain Corporation was acquired from J.W. Childs in 2004, but 51% was sold to Unicharm in December 2011.
- SCM Sierra Gorda, 13.5% of shares until 2021.
- Speewah Fluorite Project in Western Australia, in partnership with Tivan.

== Shareholders ==
- Sumitomo Life Insurance Co.
- Sumitomo Mitsui Banking Corporation
- The Bank of Tokyo-Mitsubishi UFJ, Ltd.
- The Sumitomo Trust and Banking Co., Ltd.
- Japan Trustee Services Bank, Ltd.
- Mitsui Sumitomo Insurance Group Holdings, Inc.
- NEC Corporation
- Mitsubishi UFJ Trust and Banking Corporation
- The Dai-ichi Mutual Life Insurance Company
- SKY Perfect JSAT Group
- Berkshire Hathaway
