= Midas (automotive service) =

American chain of automotive service centers

Midas International, LLC
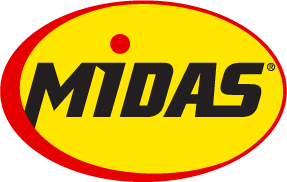
- Formerly: Midas Muffler
- Type: Subsidiary
- Founded: April 20, 1956; 70 years ago Macon, Georgia, United States
- Founder: Nate H. Sherman
- Headquarters: Palm Beach Gardens, Florida, United States
- Key people: Alan Feldman (CEO)
- Services: Retail tire sales and service, mufflers & exhaust, oil changes, belts & hoses, wiper blades, heating and cooling services, and automotive repairs
- Revenue: US$183.6 million (2011)
- Operating income: US$17.8 million (2011)
- Net income: US$4 million (2011)
- Total assets: US$215.8 million (2011)
- Parent: IC Industries, Inc. (1972–1988); Whitman Corporation (1988–1997); TBC Corporation (2012–2025); Mavis Tire Express Services Corporation (2025–present)
- Website: midas.com

Midas International, LLC is an American chain of automotive service centers headquartered in Palm Beach Gardens, Florida. It is one of the world's largest providers of automotive services, offering brake, maintenance, tires, exhaust, steering and suspension services at more than 3,500 franchised, licensed and company-owned Midas shops in 13 countries, including nearly 1,300 in the United States and Canada.

In its North American main and home market, Midas stores are company-owned or franchised. In the 17 other countries it operates in, the service centers are either licensed or franchised. Midas also owns the SpeeDee Oil & Auto Service business, with more than 150 auto service centers in the United States. Midas has ranked #150 on Entrepreneurs top Franchise 500.

== Company history ==
In April 1956, Midas, an acronym of Muffler Installation Dealers Association, was established by Nate H. Sherman (1898–1980) and the first Midas Muffler opened that year in Macon, Georgia. Within a year, there were 100 locations in 40 states. The company expanded to Canada in 1961, opening locations in Ontario and Quebec. It also entered the recreational vehicle space in 1965. In 1967, Gordon B. Sherman, son of the founder, was named president of the Chicago-based Midas International Corporation, with his father serving as chairman.

=== IC Industries, Inc.- Whitman Corporation ===
The company was in crisis by 1970. Profits dropped under the younger Sherman. Father and son also feuded over the future of Midas, resulting in Gordon resigning in September. During this time, a group of Detroit franchise operators broke from Midas, filed an antitrust lawsuit against the company, and founded Tuffy Tire & Auto Service Centers. In 1971, Gordon Sherman initiated a proxy fight to wrest control of the company from his father, but ultimately lost.

Soon after, the elder Sherman sold his controlling interest in the company, and a merger with IC Industries, Inc. was announced in September 1971. IC Industries, Inc. installed Ralph Weiger as president, who focused on international expansion and servicing foreign cars. He spent $2.5 million on a new plant outside Chicago that built replacement parts for cars. Midas also opened a 130,000 square foot manufacturing and assembly plant in Elkhart, Indiana to design trailers, travel trailers, and motor homes.

By 1976, Midas had shops in eight foreign countries, recreational vehicle sales up to $106 million, and dollar earnings five times as large as two years earlier. In December, the company opened its 900th shop. Though the company initially focused on muffler installation, Midas introduced brake services in 1979.

In 1981, the company bought a majority interest in 1-2-3 Autoservice, an automotive service chain based in Europe. The deal put Midas in control of 102 shops in Germany, Austria, Belgium, and the Netherlands. IC Industries, Inc. sold off Midas' unprofitable aluminum boats, truck body, trailer, recreational vehicle, plastic parts, and van-conversion operations in 1982, allowing the company to focus more on its profitable under-the-car services. By 1983, Midas had captured 26% of the $1.3 billion American exhaust repair market, with 1,300 outlets across all 50 states.

IC Industries, Inc. took on the Whitman Corporation name in December 1988. Struggling financially, the conglomerate divested the Pet, Inc. brand in 1990, then the Midas International and Hussman refrigeration subsidiaries in 1997.

=== Independent company ===
By 2003, Midas was struggling financially. It owed money on a loan that was set to expire, the stock price was down, sales and profits had been in steady decline, and franchise owners were unhappy.

The company hired Alan Feldman in January 2003 to right the ship. That month, Midas signaled it would sell its 77 Parts Warehouse sites. By April, it announced that it was instead shutting down the subsidiary along with its regional distribution centers. Instead, all auto service shops would start buying parts from AutoZone in the United States and Uni-Select in Canada. Feldman also reduced the number of company operated shops from 111 to 73 and reduced employment at Midas’ headquarters and in the field from 1,900 to 900. Starting in 2004, Midas began selling Bridgestone and Firestone tires in more than 750 shops. The company proved to be profitable for the first time in two years.

As part of its plan to exit the exhaust manufacturing business, Midas announced in 2005 that it had sold Huth, the companies pipe bender operation since 1968. It also planned to shut down its muffler manufacturing plant in Hartford, Wisconsin.

In 2008, the company acquired G.C. & K.B. Investments, Inc. The deal put Midas in control of 181 franchised SpeeDee Auto Service Center locations based in the United States and Mexico.

=== Acquisition by TBC ===
Midas was acquired by TBC Corporation in March 2012 for $310 million. The company had nearly 2,300 locations worldwide at the time. Through November 2015, North American sales increased for 29 straight months under the TBC Corporation.

Under the TBC Corporation, Midas made a concerted effort to increase tire services. In 2016, it partnered with Michelin to install the companies tires at more than 1,000 franchised locations. It SpeeDee was divested in 2017 and sold to Grease Monkey.

=== Sale to Mavis ===
In March 2025, TBC Corporation announced it would divest Midas, and its 1,200 locations across the United States and Canada, to Mavis Tire Express Services Corporation. Midas is expected to operate as a standalone brand. The transaction closed on June 16, 2025, after TBC Corporation obtained the necessary regulatory approvals. With the acquisition, Mavis's combined retail network expanded to more than 3,500 locations across the United States and Canada, including nearly 1,300 franchised locations.

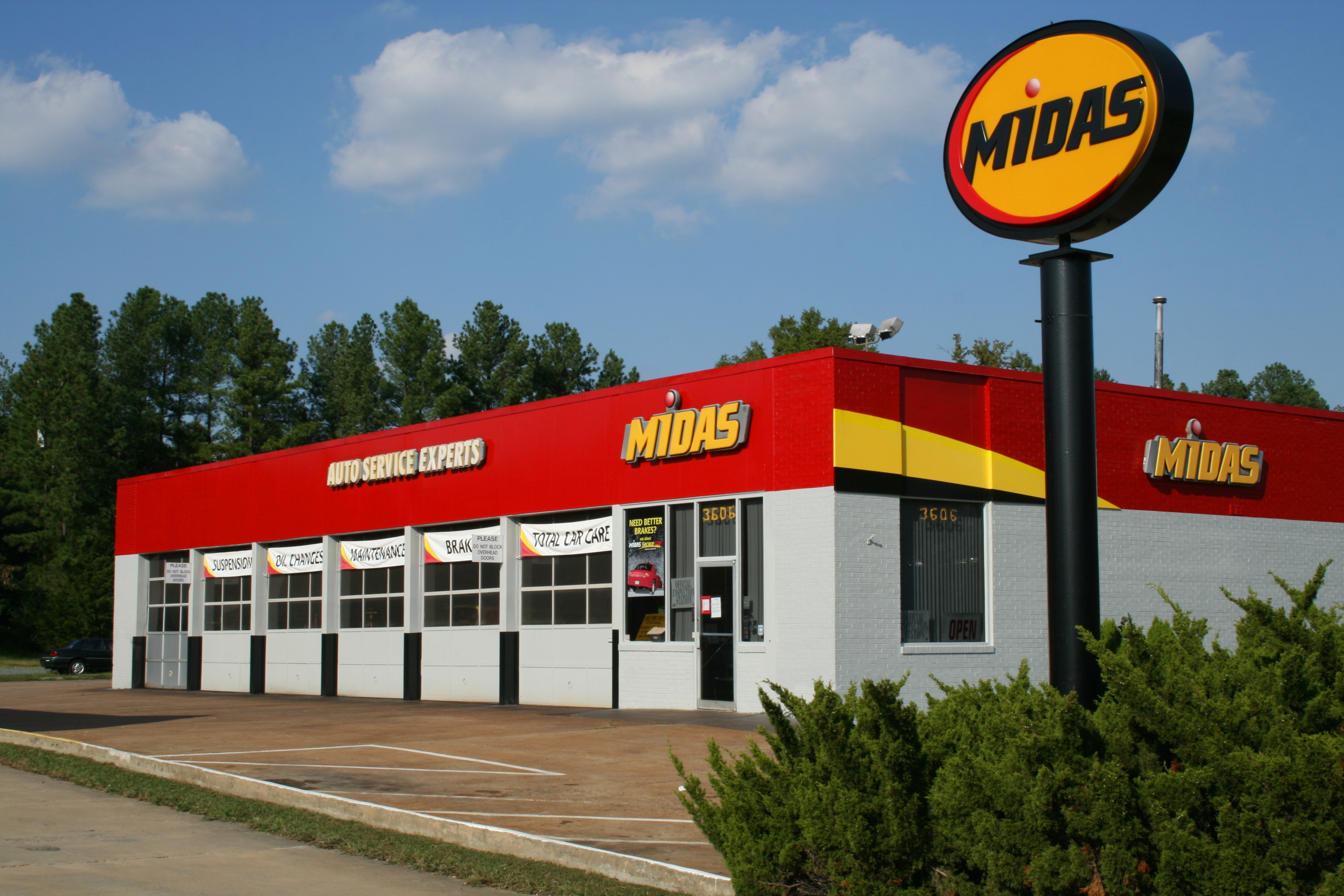
Midas in Durham, North Carolina.

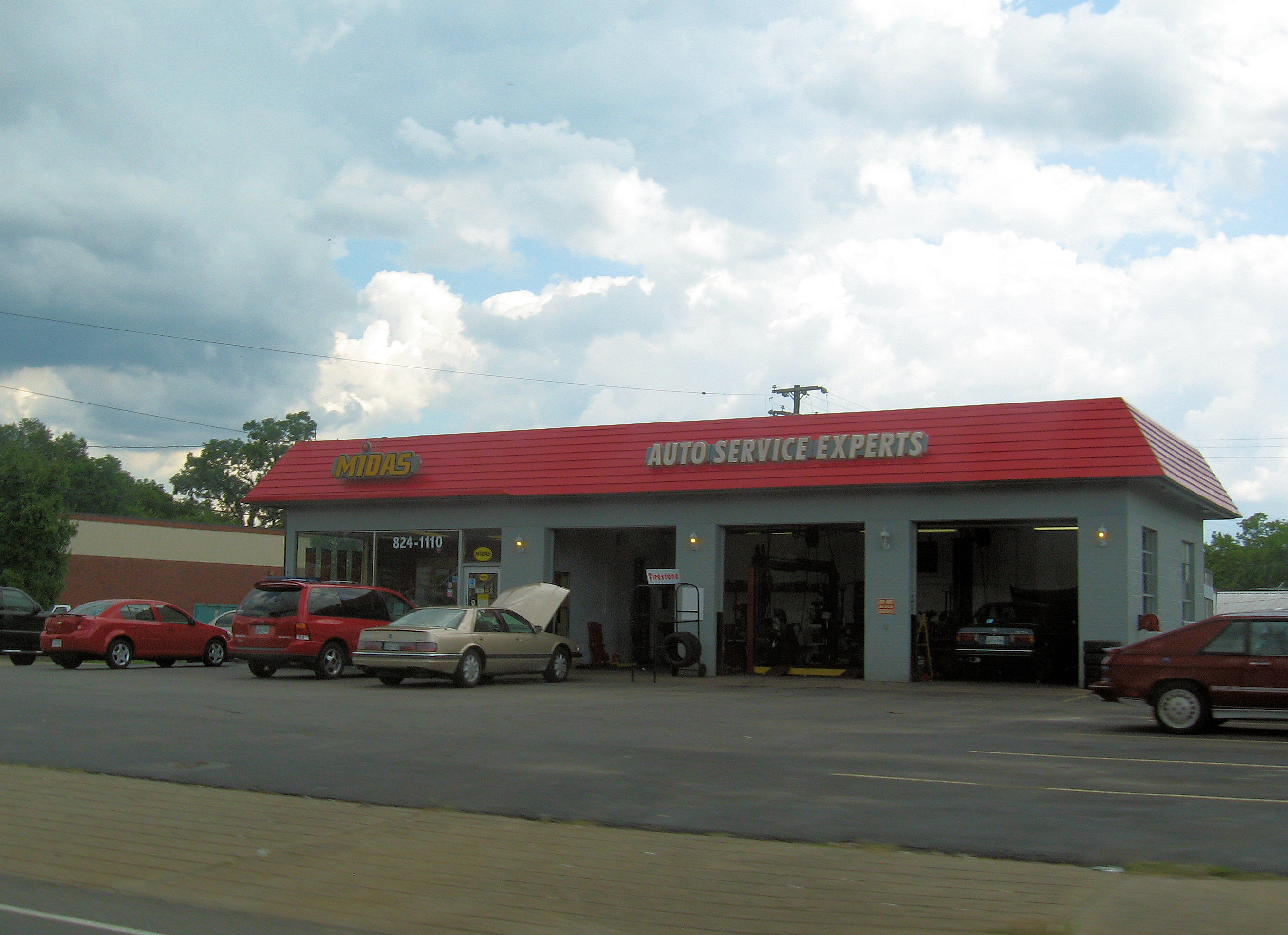
Midas in Goodlettsville, Tennessee.

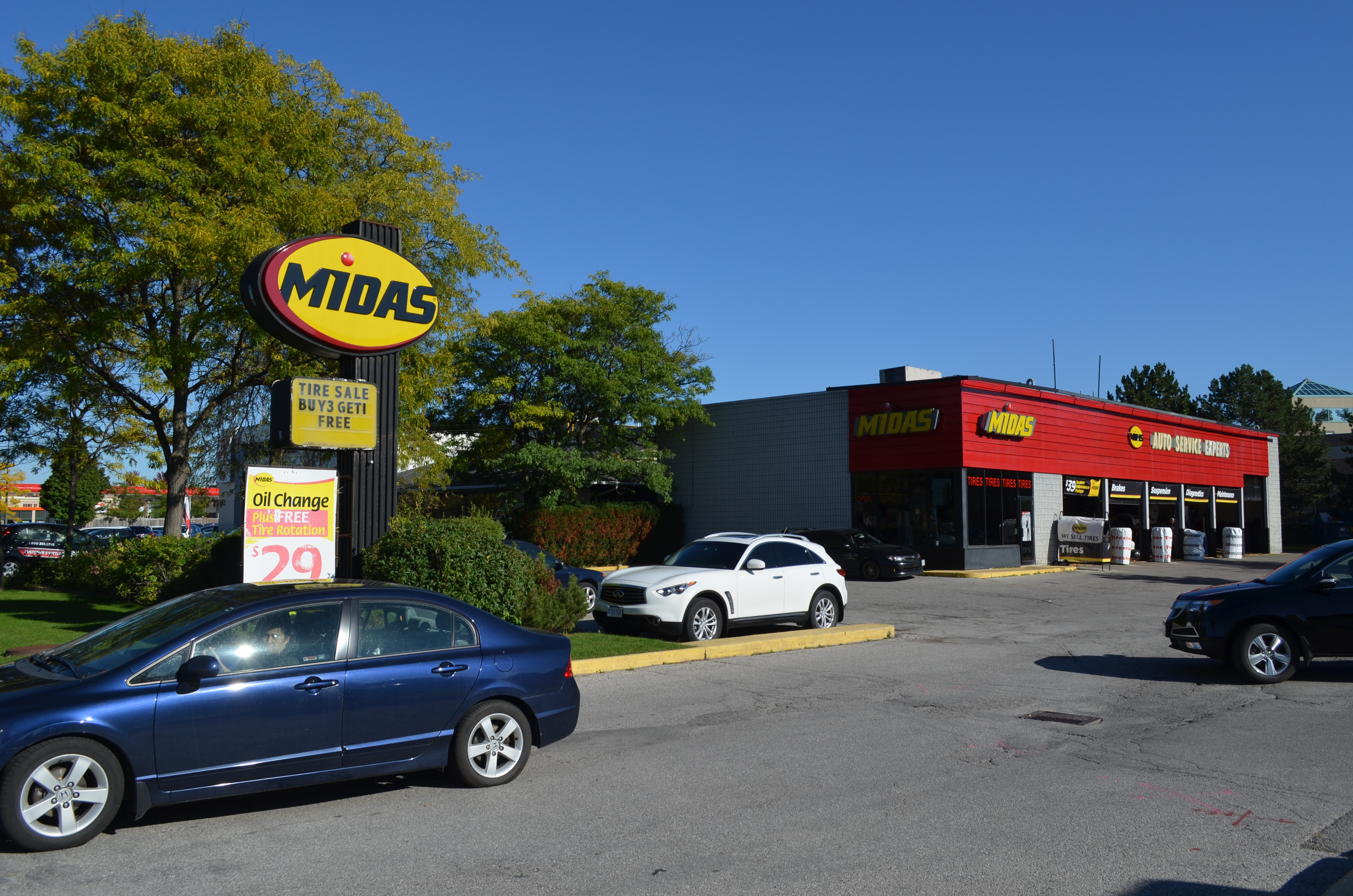
Midas in Markham, Ontario.

== Midas in Europe ==
Midas established its presence in Europe in 1973 with the opening of its first branch in Belgium. Since then, the company has rapidly expanded across the continent, establishing a strong presence in countries such as France, Spain, Portugal, Italy, etc. Since 2004, Midas is controlled by the French company Mobivia in Europe. In subsequent years, Midas continued its expansion through a franchise model. Unlike in North America, operations in Europe continue to use the original King Midas-themed logomark and branding.

== Legal matters ==
A Midas franchisee was sued by the state of California in 2009 for using bait-and-switch method of defrauding consumers. In 22 locations throughout the state, the locations were accused of luring customers into the store by advertising cheap auto-service, and then upselling them by up to $1,700. The findings came after a four-year undercover investigation. The case was finally settled in January 2010 for $1.8 million, and the operator was forced to give up his stores.

== Advertising ==
The company is responsible for the so-called Muffler Man, large fiberglass roadside attractions that exist across the United States. In the 1960s and 1970s, Nate Sherman commissioned International Fiberglass to make giant fiberglass men for fuel stations and muffler dealers. Many of these Muffler Men still exist today. One Muffler Man statue in New Jersey was featured in the opening scene title sequence of The Sopranos.

Midas is known for its use of slogans in advertising, including:

- Nobody beats Midas. Nobody. (1977–1986)
- The Midas Way. The way it should be. (1987–1996)
- You should trust a Midas touch (1995–2000)
- Trust the Midas touch (2001–Present)
- Trust Midas (2006–2007)

Midas has been represented in television commercials by a fictional character and spokesman called the "Midas Man". The character has been portrayed by actor Ralph Peduto, who is remembered for his catchphrase: "Nobody beats Midas. Nobody."

In the 1980s, Western film icon Lee Van Cleef appeared in a series of commercials for Midas, where he played a stoic cowboy who could repair cars with great speed. The commercials included guest appearances from fellow Western film icons John Phillip Law, George Kennedy, Jack Palance, Henry Silva, and Bo Hopkins.

In 2026, William Zabka of The Karate Kid film and Cobra Kai television series did a series of commercials for Midas where he plays a sensei-type character based off his Sensei Johnny Lawrence character from the film and television series.

== International Midas Dealers Association ==
The International Midas Dealers Association (IMDA) is a not-for-profit corporation of Midas dealers. According to its bylaws, the association's purpose is to advocate for and enhance profitability of its dealers.

The association begain in 1970 as the National Muffler Dealers Association by eight Midas dealers. The association changed its name in 1979 to the National Midas Dealers Association and then again in 1994 to the International Midas Dealers Association when Canadians were invited to join the association.

The IMDA is led by a 12-person Board of Directors.
