= Big O Tires =

Tire retailer in the United States and Canada

Big O Tires, LLC.
- Type: Subsidiary
- Industry: Automobile service Franchising
- Predecessor: OK Tires
- Founded: 1962; 64 years ago
- Founder: OK Tires; Harold V. James; Big O Tires; James Clarence P. Snow; Millard; Arthur "Pete" Marrero; James Darwin Gunnell
- Headquarters: Palm Beach Gardens, Florida, U.S.
- Number of locations: 470 (2026)
- Area served: United States
- Key people: Gary Skidmore (COO)
- Products: Automobile tires
- Services: Selling and servicing tires, wheels, and alignments. Lube, oil, and filter changes, battery replacement, lamps, struts installation, and brake service
- Revenue: US$979 million (2021)
- Number of employees: 3,000 (2021)
- Parent: TBC Corporation (1996–present)
- Website: www.bigotires.com

Big O Tires, LLC. is a tire and auto service shop headquartered in Palm Beach Gardens, Florida. It has been a wholly owned subsidiary of TBC Corporation since 1996. Big O Tires is one of North America's largest retail tire franchisors, with more than 470 independently owned and operated locations extending through 23 states primarily in the Western and Midwestern United States.

Big O private brand tires and other leading brands are available at all 470+ locations. In addition to selling and servicing tires, wheels, and alignments, Big O Tires provides routine maintenance and replacement services including, but not limited to: oil and filter changes, batteries, brakes, suspension and steering services.

== History ==
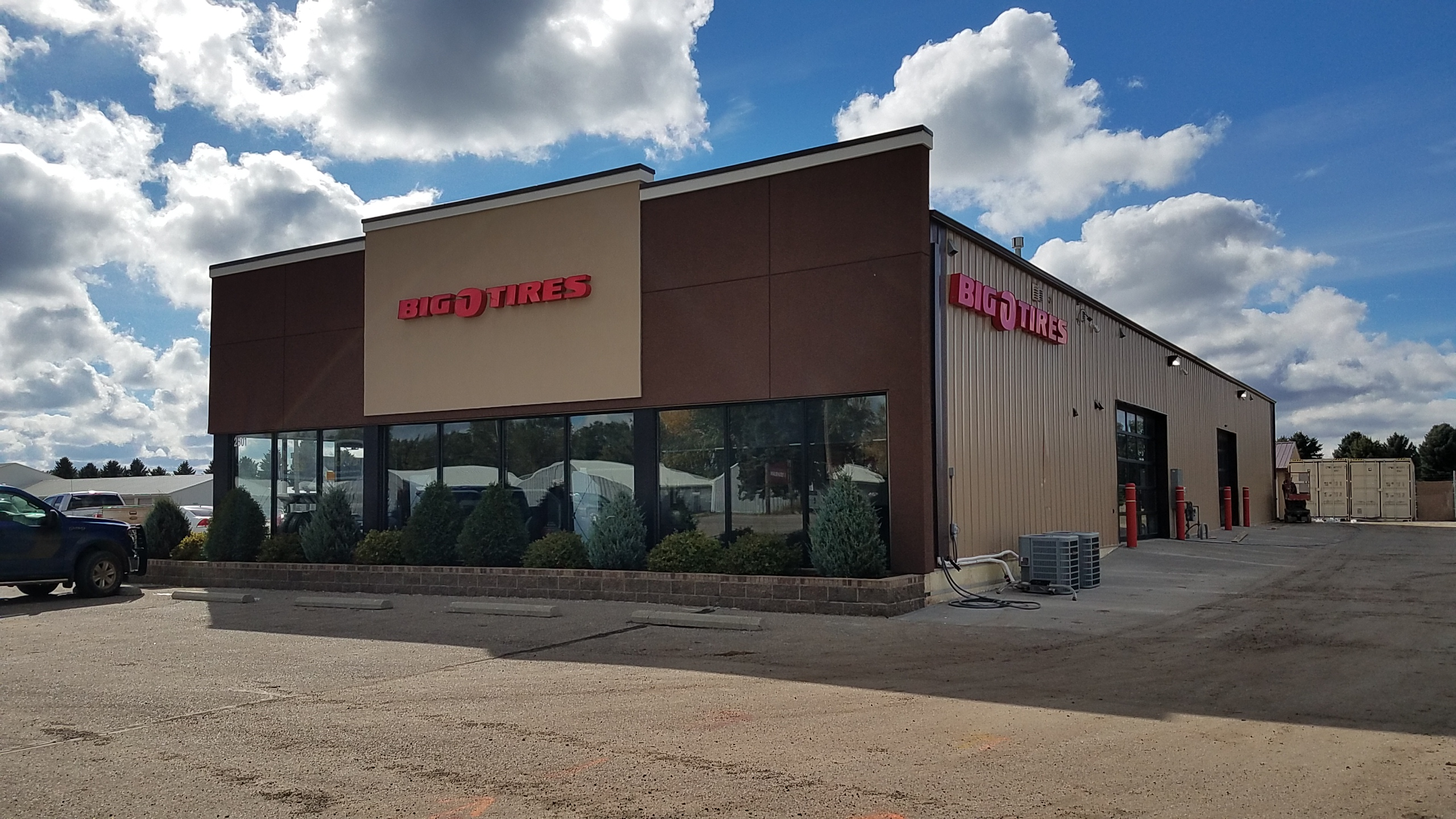
Big O Tires in North Dakota.

The company was founded in 1962, when it split from OK Tires, it was headquartered in Englewood, Colorado. In 1996, it was acquired by TBC Corporation, which also owns Tire Kingdom and NTB. In 2006, TBC was acquired by Sumitomo Corporation of Americas. In 2018, Michelin North America Inc. (MNAI) and Sumitomo Corporation of Americas (SCOA) announced a definitive agreement to combine their respective North American replacement tire distribution and related service operations in a 50–50 joint venture. Big O Tires remains a wholly owned subsidiary of TBC Corporation.

In 1977, Big O Tires was awarded $19.6 million from Goodyear in a case over the use of the name "bigfoot" tires. The award equaled 25% of Goodyear's advertising budget in the states where Big O operated. It was later reduced on appeal and settled out of court.
