= TBC Corporation =

American auto parts corporation

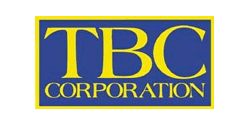
- Headquarters: Palm Beach Gardens, Florida
- Key people: Don Byrd (CEO)
- Services: Automotive shops
- Owner: Sumitomo Corporation of Americas (50%); Michelin (50%)
- Subsidiaries: TBC Brands; National Tire Wholesale; Big O Tires
- Website: www.tbccorp.com

TBC Corporation is an American corporation and marketer of automotive replacement tires.

== History ==
In 1956, a purchasing group of tire retailers formed Cordovan Associates. The company changed its name to Tire & Battery Corporation in 1972. Eleven years later, Tire & Battery Corporation went public (NASDAQ: TBCC). In 2005, the company was purchased by Sumitomo Corporation of America (SCOA), one of Japan's major integrated trading and investment business enterprises. In 2018, Michelin North America and Sumitomo Corporation of Americas combined their respective North American tire distribution and related service operations in a 50–50 joint venture agreement, creating National Tire Wholesale (NTW).

== Company operations ==
TBC markets on a wholesale basis to regional tire chains and distributors serving independent tire dealers throughout the United States, Canada, and Mexico. Through distribution centers, the company also markets directly to independent tire dealers across the United States. NTW sells a wide variety of proprietary and national brands from over 100 distribution centers.

TBC owns a number of industry brands, including:

- National Tire Wholesale (NTW)
- Midas, a franchised automotive service chain. Purchased by TBC Corporation in 2012.
- Big O Tires, a franchise selling automobile tires. Purchased by TBC Corporation in 1996.
