= Wise =

Wise, as a word, refers to someone with wisdom.

Wise may also refer to:

== People ==
- Wise (surname)
- Wise (composer), also known as Wise da' Gangsta, a reggaeton producer/songwriter
- Wise (rapper) (born 1979), Japanese hip hop artist
- Wise (Stetsasonic), real name Leonardo Roman, a hip hop artist known as 'Wise' from the group 'Stetsasonic'
- Rhett Wiseman, nicknamed "Wise" (born 1994), American professional baseball player

== Places ==
=== United States ===
- Wise, North Carolina
- Wise, Virginia
- Wana, West Virginia, also known as Wise
- Wise County, Texas
- Wise County, Virginia
- Wise River, Montana
- Wise Township, Michigan

== Businesses ==
- Wise (company), a London-based financial services company
- Wise Company department store in Long Beach, California
- Wise Foods, Inc., a snack food manufacturer
- Wise Solutions, an American software company that made the Wise software installation package
- Wise Stores, a Canadian department store, mainly in Quebec

== Other uses ==
- Wise, showing wisdom: good judgement or the benefit of experience
- Wise Observatory, an astronomical observatory owned and operated by Tel Aviv University

== See also ==
- WISE (disambiguation)
- List of people known as the Wise
- Weis (disambiguation)
- Weiss (disambiguation)
- Weisz
- Weiz
- Wiseman (disambiguation)
- Wyse (disambiguation)
