= Weise =

Weise is a surname, meaning "wise" or "prudent" in German.

Notable people with the name include:

== A ==
- Andreas Weise (born 1986), Swedish singer and songwriter
- Agustín Saavedra Weise (1943–2021), Bolivian diplomat and writer
- Arne Weise (1930–2019), Swedish television personality

== B ==
- Birgit Weise, German luger
- Brian Weise, American soccer coach

== C ==
- Christian Weise (1642–1708), German writer and dramatist

== D ==
- Dale Weise (born 1988), Canadian ice hockey player
- Dietrich Weise (1934–2020), German football player and manager
- Dirk Weise (born 1952), German sprint canoer

== E ==
- Eberhard Weise (born 1953), German bobsledder

== H ==
- Hans-Joachim Weise (1912–1991), German competitive sailor
- Hubert Weise (1884–1950), German Luftwaffe officer

== J ==
- Jeff Weise (1988–2005), American spree killer and school shooter who perpetrated the 2005 Red Lake shootings
- Julia Vargas-Weise (1942–2018) Bolivian photographer, screenwriter, educator, and film director
- Julius Weise (1844–1925), German entomologist

== K ==
- Karl Heinrich Weise (1909–1990), German mathematician
- Konrad Weise (born 1951), German football player

== M ==
- Małgorzata Wiese-Jóźwiak (born 1961), Polish chess player
- Markus Weise (born 1962), German field hockey coach
- Martin Weise (1903–1943), German journalist and resistance fighter

== O ==
- Oskar Weise (1851–1933), German linguist for whom Weise's law is named

== W ==
- Wolfgang Weise (born 1949), German volleyball player
- Woeser (born 1966), also written Wéisè, Tibetan activist, blogger, poet and essayist

== See also ==
- Weis (disambiguation)
- Weiser (disambiguation)
- Weiss (disambiguation)
- Weisse
- Weisz
- Wiese (disambiguation)
