= Weis =

Weis may refer to:

- Weis (surname), including a list of people with the name
- Weis, an Australian frozen dessert brand
- Weis Markets, supermarket chain
- WEIS (AM), a radio station (990 AM) licensed to Centre, Alabama, USA
- Weis Manufacturing Company, a NRHP in Monroe, Michigan
- Weis, the middle frog in the Budweiser Frogs advertising campaign

== See also ==
- Weise
- Weiss (disambiguation)
- Weisse
- Weisz
- Wise (disambiguation)
- WAIS (disambiguation)
