= Wiese =

Wiese may refer to:

== Places ==
=== Modern day ===
- Wiese (Apfeldorf), a village in Apfeldorf, Landsberg am Lech, Bavaria, Germany
- Wiese (Märkische Heide), a village in Märkische Heide, Oder-Spree, Brandenburg, Germany
- Wiese (Much), a village in Much, Rhein-Sieg-Kreis, North Rhine-Westphalia, Germany
- Wiese Islands, an island group to the east of the Biscoe Islands of Antarctica
- Wiese Island, in the Arctic Ocean

=== Historic ===
- Louka u Litvínova, formerly Wiese, Czechia; a village and municipality in Ústí nad Labem Region, Czech Republic
- Wisznia Mała, formerly Wiese; a village in Trzebnicki, Lower Silesia Voivodship, Poland
- Barzyna, Warmian-Masurian Voivodeship, formerly Wiese; a village in Poland

== Bodies of water ==
- Wiese (river), a tributary of the Rhine in southwest Germany and northwest Switzerland
- Little Wiese, a tributary of the Wiese
- Köhlgartenwiese, a tributary of the Little Wiese

== People with the surname ==
- Bill Wiese, author of 23 Minutes in Hell
- Carina Wiese (born 1968), German actress
- Christo Wiese (born 1941), South African businessman
- Cobus Wiese (born 1997), South African rugby union player
- David Wiese (born 1985), South African cricketer
- Dirk Wiese (politician) (born 1983), German politician
- Erik Wiese (born 1974), American animator and storyboard artist
- Hartwig Friedrich Wiese (1840–1905), German engineer, naturalist and antiquarian
- Jasper Wiese (born 1995), South African rugby union player
- Klaus Wiese (1942–2009), e-musician, minimalist, and multi-instrumentalist
- Kobus Wiese (born 1964), South African rugby player
- Marli Wiese, American politician
- Richard Wiese (born 1959), American explorer
- Sydney Wiese (born 1995), American basketball player
- Tim Wiese (born 1981), German football player and wrestler
- Trygve Wiese (born 1985), Norwegian music producer and DJ

== See also ==
- Wiesen (disambiguation)
- Wiesloch, a city in Germany
- Wise (disambiguation)
