= Weisler =

Weisler is a surname. Notable people with the surname include:

- Bob Wiesler (1930–2014), American baseball player
- Dion Weisler (born 1967), Australian-born businessman living in the United States

== See also ==
- Weiser (disambiguation)
- Weisser
