= Wise guy =

Wise guy or Wiseguy may refer to:

== Film and TV ==
- Wiseguy (TV series), a US television series
- The Wise Guy, a 1926 silent crime drama film directed by Frank Lloyd
- The Wise Guys, a 1965 French comedy film directed by Robert Enrico
- Wise Guys (1961 film), directed by Claude Chabrol
- Wise Guys (1986 film), directed by Brian De Palma
- Wise Guy: David Chase and the Sopranos, a 2024 documentary film
- The Alto Knights, a 2025 film known during the production as Wise Guys

== Music ==
- Wise Guys (band), a German a cappella group
- The Wiseguys, a British electronica hip hop band
- "Wise Guy", a 1998 song by Joe Pesci, from the album Vincent LaGuardia Gambini Sings Just for You
- Wise Guys (album), a 1998 album by Ghetto Commission
- Tropical Gangsters, a 1982 album by Kid Creole and the Coconuts, released in the US as Wise Guy

== Other ==
- Wise Guy (musical), an unproduced musical by Irving Berlin
- Wise Guys, a Stephen Sondheim musical later renamed Road Show
- Wiseguy (The Simpsons), a fictional character on The Simpsons
- Wiseguy (book), a 1986 nonfiction book by Nicholas Pileggi that was the basis for the film Goodfellas
- Made man, an official member of the Mafia

== See also ==
- Wise man
- Smart aleck (disambiguation)
