= Wieser =

Wieser is a surname. Notable people with the surname include:

- Frances Wieser (1868–1949), American scientific illustrator
- Friedrich von Wieser (1851–1926), Austrian economist
- Neesha Wieser (born 1986), New Zealand netball player
- Roland Wieser (born 1956), East German racewalker
- Sandro Wieser (born 1993), Liechtensteiner footballer
- Matthäus Wieser (1617–1678), German songwriter
- Al W. Wieser, Jr. (born 1949), American politician and businessman

== See also ==
- Weiser (disambiguation)
