= Weisse =

Weisse or Weiße is a surname which means "white" in German. It may refer to:

== People ==
- Charles H. Weisse (1866–1919), American politician
- Christian Felix Weiße (1726–1804), German writer
- Christian Hermann Weisse (1801–1866), German Protestant religious philosopher
- Michael Weiße (c.1488–1534), German theologian and hymn writer

== See also ==
- Weiße Frauen, type of female elf in Germanic mythology
- Weis (disambiguation)
- Weise (disambiguation)
- Weiser (disambiguation)
- Weiss (disambiguation)
- Weisz (disambiguation)
