= Wais =

Wais is a given name.

== People ==
- Wais Ibrahim Khairandesh, Afghan athlete
- Wais Barmak, Afghan politician and former member of the Ghani administration
- Omar Ahmed Wais, Djiboutian politician

== Places ==
- Veys, a city in Khuzestan Province, Iran

== See also ==
- WAIS (disambiguation)
