= Three Wise Men (disambiguation) =

Three Wise Men is an alternative term for the Biblical Magi.

Three Wise Men may also refer to:

- Three Wise Men (2008 film), 2008 Finnish film
- Three Wise Men (2016 film), 2016 Nigerian film
- The 3 Wise Men, 2003 Spanish animated film
- Three Wise Men (cocktail), drink made from mixing three different whiskeys
- Three Wise Men (volcanoes), row of three underwater volcanoes located in the Pacific Ocean
- Three Wise Men of Gotham, early name given to the people of the village of Gotham, Nottinghamshire
- Three Wise Men of the East (professional wrestling), term for three managers in the WWF during the 1970s and 1980s — Ernie Roth, Lou Albano, and Freddie Blassie
- Three Wise Men (Canadian politics), nickname for Quebec intellectuals Jean Marchand, Gérard Pelletier, and Pierre Trudeau, who were elected to Parliament in 1965
- Three Wise Men (European politics), nickname for a trio of politicians appointed by the European Council in 1979 to deliberate on the shape of the European institutions - Robert Marjolin, Barend Biesheuvel and Edmund Dell
- Three Wise Men, a "lifeline" in the Who Wants to Be a Millionaire? franchise

== See also ==
- Wise men
