= BMW B58 =

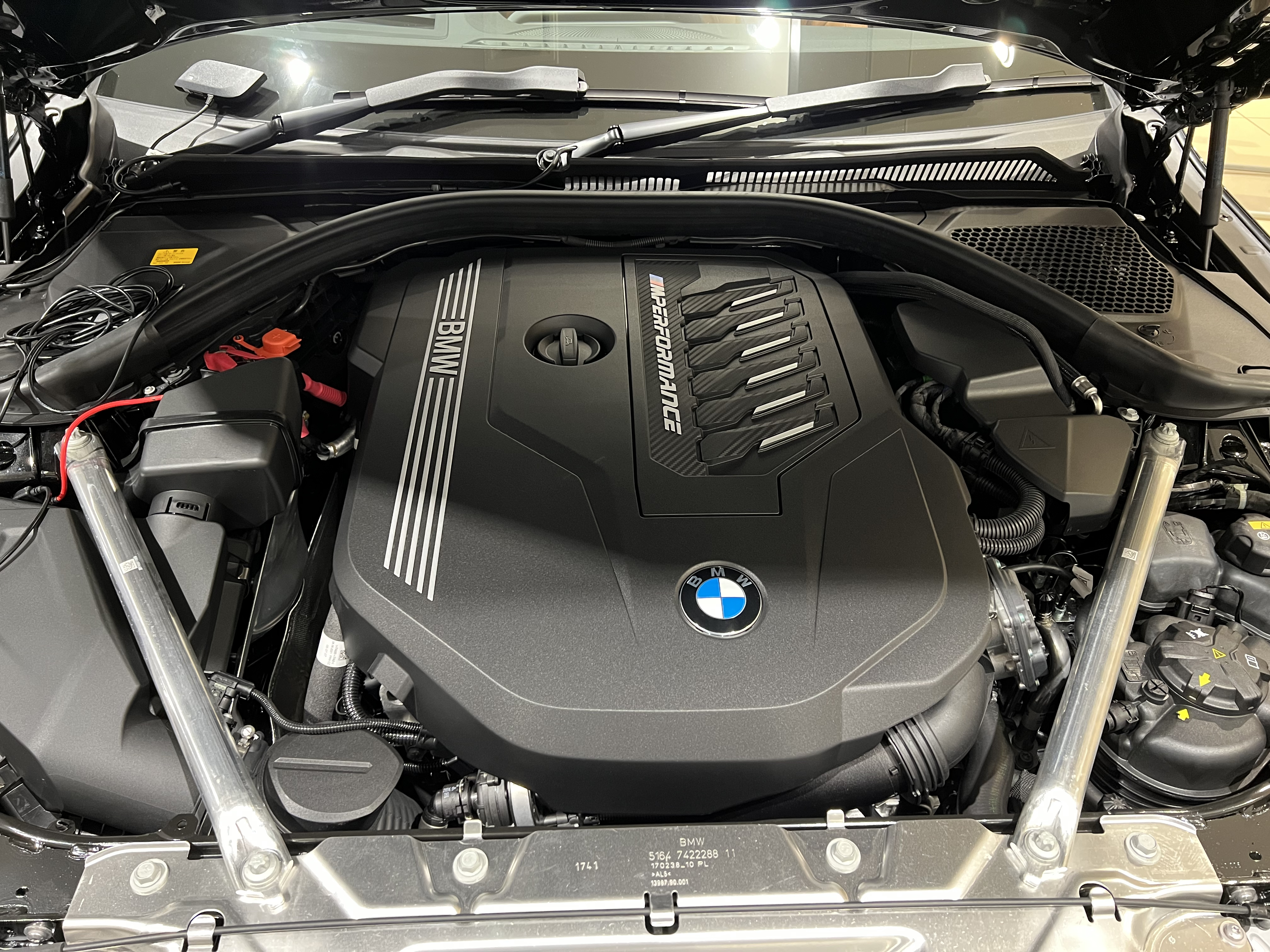
- B58B30O1 in a G22 M440i

Overview
- Manufacturer: BMW
- Production: 2015–present

Layout
- Configuration: Straight-six
- Displacement: 3.0 L (2,998 cc)
- Cylinder bore: 82 mm (3.23 in)
- Piston stroke: 94.6 mm (3.72 in)
- Cylinder block material: Closed-deck aluminium
- Cylinder head material: Aluminium
- Valvetrain: DOHC 4 valves x cyl. with Valvetronic and Double VANOS
- Valvetrain drive system: Chain
- Compression ratio: 10.2:1 - 11.0:1

RPM range
- Max. engine speed: 7,000 rpm

Combustion
- Turbocharger: Single twin-scroll turbocharger with air-to-liquid intercooler
- Fuel system: Direct injection
- Management: Bosch Di-Motronic
- Fuel type: Petrol
- Oil system: Wet sump with water heat exchanger
- Cooling system: Water-cooled

Output
- Power output: 213–324 kW (290–441 PS)
- Torque output: 450–571 N⋅m (332–421 lb⋅ft)

Dimensions
- Dry weight: 139 kg (306 lb)

Chronology
- Predecessor: BMW N55

The BMW B58 is a turbocharged straight-six engine, which began production in 2015. The B58 replaced the N55 and was launched in the F30 340i.

The B58 is part of BMW's modular engine family, each engine using a displacement of 500 cc (30.5 cu in) per cylinder, following the B38 and B48 engine.

The B58 engine was named to Ward's World's 10 Best Engines five times, in 2016 (installed in the 340i), 2017 (M240i), 2019 (X5) 2020, (M340i). and 2024 (BMW X5 xDrive50e)

The S58 engine, which was released in early 2019, is the high-performance version of the B58. It was named to Ward's World's 10 Best Engines in 2023 (installed in the M2).

== Design ==
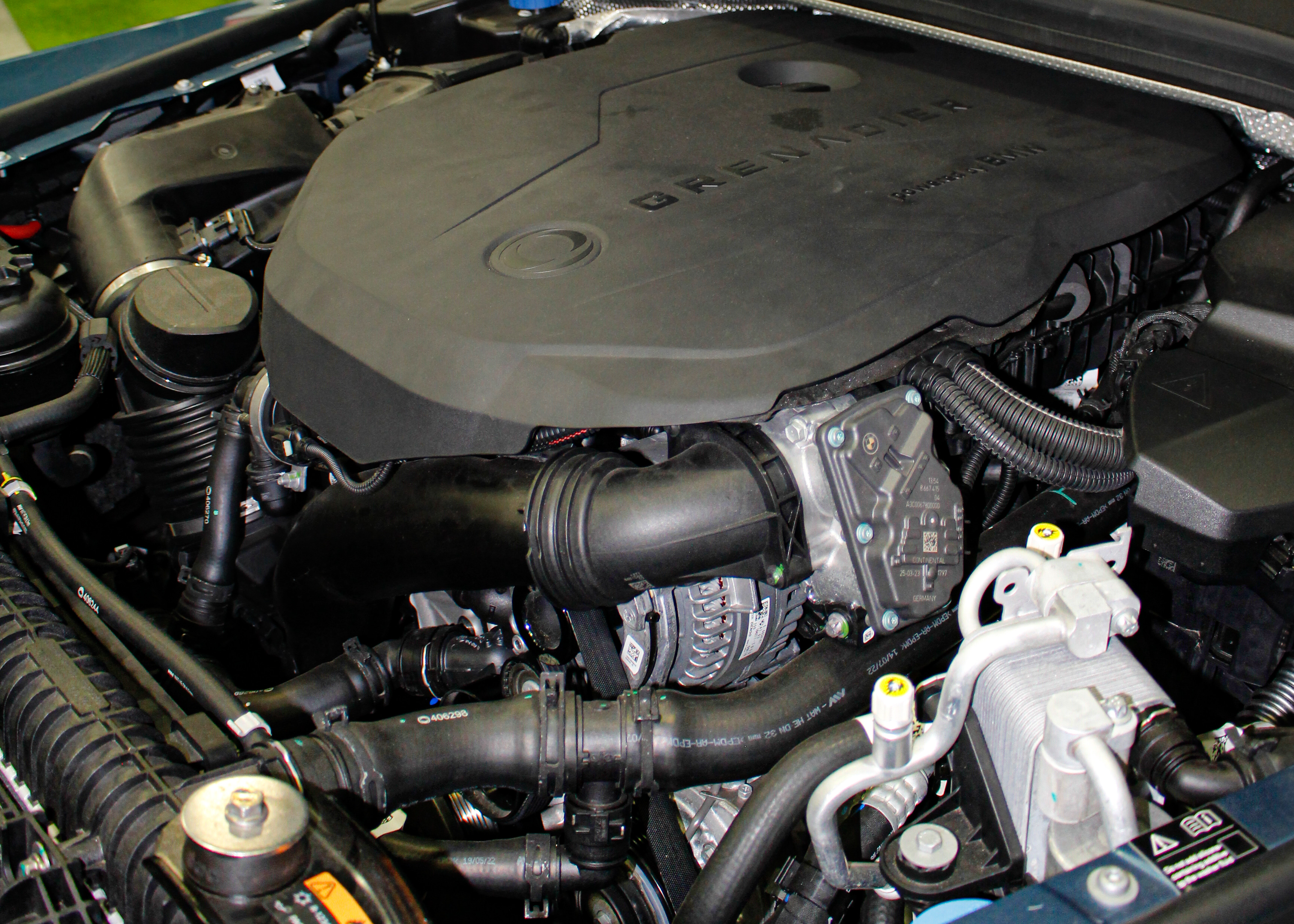
B58B30C in a 2024 Ineos Grenadier

Compared with its BMW N55 predecessor, the B58 features a 20% increase in boost pressure, a closed-deck engine block design, an increase in compression ratio to 11.0:1 and a slight increase in displacement from 2,979 to 2,998 cc (181.8 to 182.9 cu in) with added weight of 8 kg (18 lb).

The turbocharger is a twin-scroll design, for more efficient power delivery with less turbo lag and more power than a conventional single turbocharger, as well as for weight and space saving benefits. The intercooler - a water-to-air design - is integrated into the intake plenum, to reduce the volume of air between the turbocharger and the cylinders.

The B58, like its predecessor the N55, features direct fuel injection, variable valve timing (called double VANOS by BMW), and variable valve lift (called Valvetronic by BMW). The redline remains at 7,000 rpm, the bore and the stroke is 82 mm × 94.6 mm (3.23 in × 3.72 in).

The B58 also features an engine-mounted heat encapsulation system to reduce engine wear and emissions during start-up.

For durability and longevity, the rotating assembly has a forged steel crankshaft and forged connecting rods.

As a part of BMW's modular engine family, the crankcase is a completely new design identical to the B57 diesel version, engineered as both a gasoline and diesel engine in one common part. The closed deck crankcase is equipped with a completely new structure which can be identified by a complex array of ribs on the exhaust and intake side and an additional reinforcement frame on the oil pump side.

The engine was revised in 2018, dubbed "B58TU", with notable changes and improvements. The fuel system was updated with 75% increased pressure with an updated high pressure fuel pump and injectors, a new particulate filter located on the exhaust system's midpipe, a new one-part timing chain as opposed to the earlier two-part, and new separate cooling circuits for the cylinder head and crankcase (using an extra split-cooling valve). For weight savings, the crankcase wall thickness and forged crankshaft were optimized, and the exhaust manifold was integrated into the cylinder head housing.

Another engine revision in 2022 added port fuel injection to complement the existing direct injection system for better emissions and functionality.

== Models ==
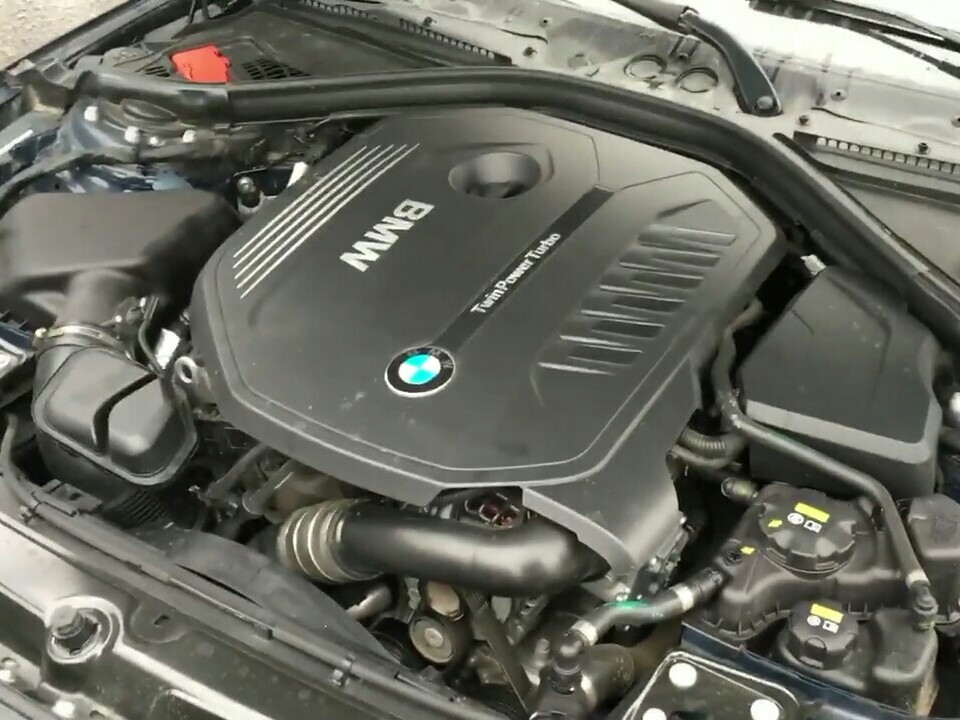
B58B30M0 in a F30 340i

Engine	Power	Torque	Years
B58B30M0	213 kW (290 PS; 286 hp) at 5,000-6,500 rpm	400 N⋅m (295 lb⋅ft)	2022–present
B58B30M0	240 kW (326 PS; 322 hp) at 5,500–6,500 rpm	450 N⋅m (332 lb⋅ft) at 1,380–5,000 rpm	2015–2019
B58B30M0	250 kW (340 PS; 335 hp) at 5,500-6,500 rpm	450 N⋅m (332 lb⋅ft) at 1,380–5,200 rpm	2017–2019
B58B30M0	250 kW (340 PS; 335 hp) at 5,500 rpm	500 N⋅m (369 lb⋅ft) at 1,520–4,500 rpm	2016–Present
B58B30M0	265 kW (360 PS; 355 hp) at 5,500-6,500 rpm	500 N⋅m (369 lb⋅ft) at 1,520–4,800 rpm	2016–2019
B58B30M1	250 kW (340 PS; 335 hp) at 5,500–6,500 rpm	450 N⋅m (332 lb⋅ft) at 1,520–4,800 rpm	2018–
B58B30C	250 kW (340 PS; 335 hp) at 5,000–6,500 rpm	500 N⋅m (369 lb⋅ft) at 1,600–4,500 rpm	2018–
B58B30O1	285 kW (387 PS; 382 hp) at 5,000–6,500 rpm	500 N⋅m (369 lb⋅ft) at 1,600–4,500 rpm	2018–
B58B30O1	324 kW (441 PS; 434 hp) at 6,000 rpm	571 N⋅m (421 lb⋅ft) at 4,500 rpm	2025–
B58B30M2	280 kW (381 PS; 375 hp) at 5,200-6,250 rpm	520 N⋅m (384 lb⋅ft) at 1850-5000 rpm	2022-
S58B30T0	338 kW (460 PS; 453 hp) at 6,250 rpm	550 N⋅m (406 lb⋅ft) at 2,600–5,950 rpm	2023–
S58B30T0	353 kW (480 PS; 473 hp) at 6,250 rpm	550 N⋅m (406 lb⋅ft) at 2,600–5,950 rpm	2020–
S58B30T0	353 kW (480 PS; 473 hp) at 6,250 rpm	620 N⋅m (457 lb⋅ft) at 2,600–5,950 rpm	2019–
S58B30T0	375 kW (510 PS; 503 hp) at 6,250 rpm	650 N⋅m (479 lb⋅ft) at 2,600–5,950 rpm	2019–

=== B58B30M0: 213 kW (290 PS; 286 hp) ===
Applications:

- 2021–2024 G30 545e
- 2023–present G70 735i (some markets)
- 2022–present Ineos Grenadier

=== B58B30M0: 240 kW (326 PS; 322 hp) ===
Applications:

- 2015–2019 F30/F31/F34 340i
- 2016–2019 F32/F33/F36 440i
- 2016–2019 G11/G12 740i/Li

=== B58B30M0: 250 kW (340 PS; 335 hp) ===
Applications:

- 2016–2019 F20/F21 M140i
- 2016–2021 F22/F23 M240i
- 2017–2019 G30/G31 540i

=== B58B30M0: 265 kW (360 PS; 355 hp) ===
This version was used for 3-/4-Series with the "M Performance Power and Sound Kit".

Applications:

- 2016–2019 F30/F31/F34 340i
- 2016–2019 F32/F33/F36 440i
- 2017–2019 G01 X3 M40i
- 2018–2019 G02 X4 M40i

=== B58B30M1: 250 kW (340 PS; 335 hp) ===
Applications:

- 2018–2023 G05 X5 xDrive40i/sDrive40i
- 2021-2023 G05 X5 xDrive45e (Detuned to 289hp, combined with electric motor to reach 389hp)
- 2018–2023 G07 X7 xDrive40i
- 2019–2026 G29 Z4 M40i (in countries subject to EU emissions standards)
- 2019–2026 Toyota GR Supra
- 2019–2026 G14/G15/G16 840i
- 2020–2023 G30/G31 540i
- 2020–2023 G32 640i
- 2020–2023 G06 X6 xDrive40i
- 2020–2022 G11/G12 740i

=== B58B30C: 250 kW (340 PS; 335 hp) ===
Applications:

- 2019–2025 Morgan Plus Six
- 2020 J29/DB Toyota Supra
- 2022–present Ineos Grenadier (detuned to 286 ps)
- 2020 - 2024 G30 545e (detuned to 286 ps)

=== B58B30O1: 285 kW (387 PS; 382 hp) ===
Applications:

- 2019–2026 G29 Z4 M40i (in countries not subject to EU emissions standards)
- 2019–2024 G20/G21 M340i
- 2020–2024 G01 X3 M40i
- 2019–2024 G02 X4 M40i
- 2021–present G22/G23/G26 M440i
- 2021–present Toyota Supra (in countries not subject to EU emissions standards)
- 2021–present G42 M240i
- 2021–present Boldmen CR4

=== B58B30O1: 324 kW (441 PS; 434 hp) ===
Applications:

- 2025 Toyota Supra A90 Final Edition (324 kW)

=== B58B30M2: 285 kW (381 PS; 375 hp) ===
Applications:

- 2022–present G07 X7 xDrive40i
- 2023–present G70 740i
- 2024–present G05 X5 xDrive40i
- 2024–present G06 X6 xDrive40i
- 2024–present G60 540i xDrive
- 2025–present G20/G21 M340i
- 2025–present G45 X3 M50 (in countries subject to EU emissions standards)
- 2024-present G05 X5 50e

=== B58B30M2: 293 kW (398 PS; 393 hp) ===
Applications:

- 2025–present G45 X3 M50 (in countries not subject to EU emissions standards)

== S58 ==
BMW S58 engine
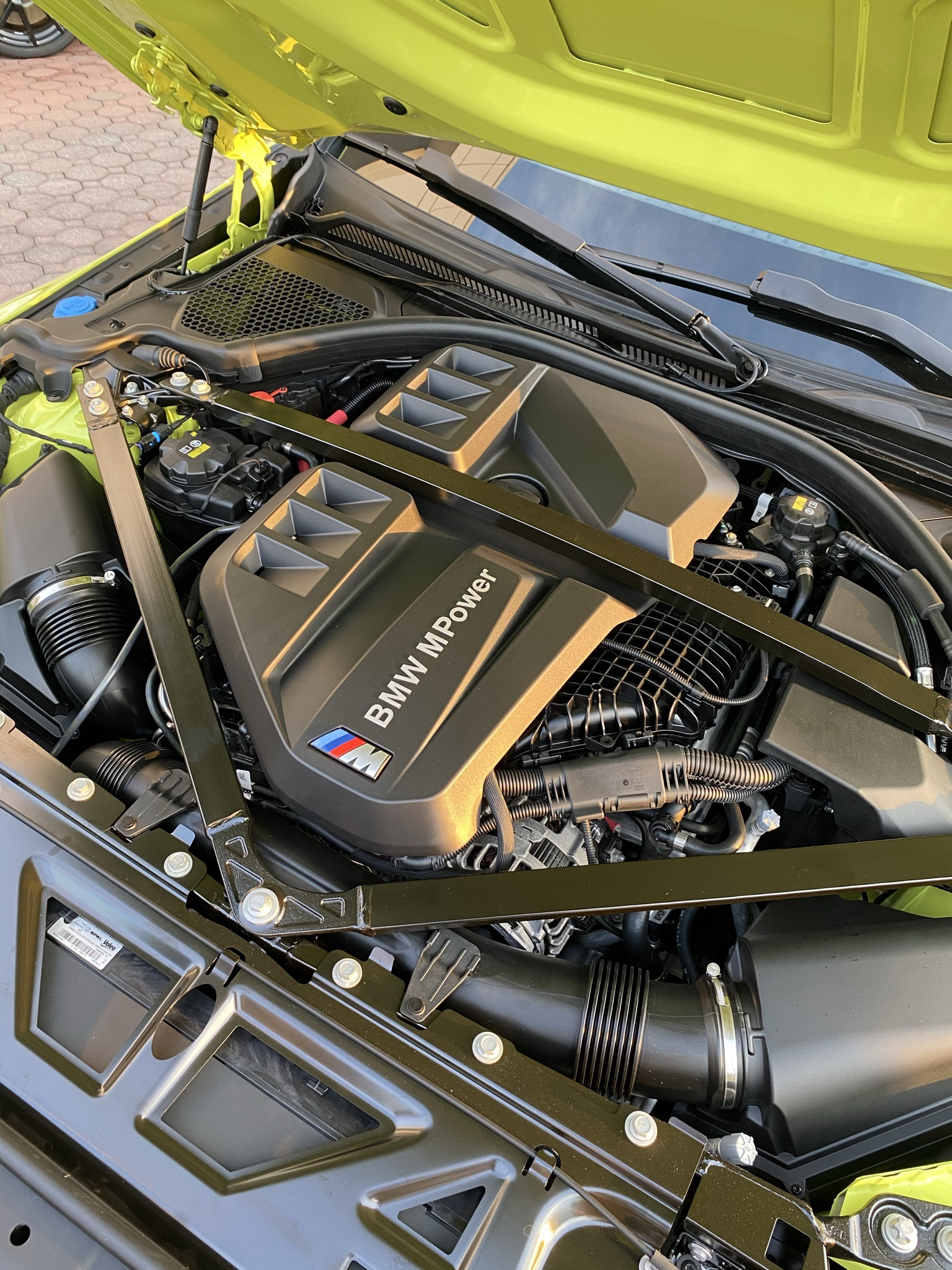

Overview
- Production: 2019–present

Layout
- Configuration: Straight-six
- Displacement: 3.0 L (2,993 cc)
- Cylinder bore: 84 mm (3.31 in)
- Piston stroke: 90 mm (3.54 in)
- Cylinder block material: Closed-deck aluminum
- Cylinder head material: Aluminum
- Valvetrain: DOHC w/ VVT & VVL
- Compression ratio: 9.3:1

RPM range
- Max. engine speed: 7,200 RPM

Combustion
- Turbocharger: Twin-Turbo with air-to-liquid intercooler
- Fuel system: Direct injection
- Fuel type: Petrol

Output
- Power output: 338–412 kW (460–560 PS)
- Torque output: 550–650 N⋅m (406–479 lb⋅ft)

Chronology
- Predecessor: BMW S55

The S58 engine is the high-performance version of the B58 engine. It was introduced in the F97 X3 M and F98 X4 M, marking the first time a stand-alone M model was produced for the X3 and X4.

The S58 features twin mono-scroll turbochargers, a compression ratio of 9.3:1, a redline at 7,200 rpm with the bore and the stroke at 84 mm × 90 mm (3.31 in × 3.54 in). It also features a forged chrome molybdenum heat-treated steel crankshaft, plus forged steel connecting rods and forged aluminum pistons. The pistons are forged by Mahle and feature their proprietary anti-friction coating.

Like the B58, the S58 also features direct fuel injection, variable valve timing (called double VANOS by BMW), and variable valve lift (called Valvetronic by BMW).

Compared to the B58, the S58 features a slightly smaller displacement, increased bore, decreased stroke, and larger valves. Compression is decreased to 9.3:1 from 11.0:1. The S58 favors top-end power and has a higher redline of 7,200 RPM.

=== S58B30T0: 338 kW (460 PS) ===
- 2023–2024 G87 M2

=== S58B30T0: 344 kW (468 PS) ===
- 2019–2022 G21 Alpina B3

=== S58B30T0: 353 kW (480 PS) ===
Applications:

- 2019–2024 F97 X3 M
- 2019–2024 F98 X4 M
- 2021–present G80 M3
- 2021–present G82 M4
- 2025–present G87 M2 (facelift)

=== S58B30T0: 364 kW (495 PS) ===
- 2022–present G26 Alpina B4 Gran Coupe
- 2023–present G20 Alpina B3

=== S58B30T0: 375 kW (510 PS) ===
Applications:

- 2019–present F97 X3 M Competition
- 2019–present F98 X4 M Competition
- 2021–present G80 M3 Competition
- 2021–present G82 M4 Competition
- 2022–present G81 M3 Competition Touring

=== S58B30T0: 389 kW (529 PS) ===
Applications:

- 2025–present G26 Alpina B4 GT Gran Coupe
- 2025–present G20 Alpina B3 GT

=== S58B30T0: 390 kW (530 PS) ===
Applications:

- 2025-Present G80 M3 Competition xDrive
- 2025-Present G81 M3 Competition Touring xDrive
- 2025-Present G82 M4 Competition xDrive
- 2026-Present G87 M2 CS

=== S58B30T0: 405 kW (550 PS) ===
Applications:

- 2022 G82 M4 CSL
- 2023 G80 M3 CS
- 2024 G82 M4 CS
- 2025 G81 M3 CS Touring

=== S58B30T0: 412 kW (560 PS) ===
Applications:

- 2023 G82 BMW 3.0 CSL
