= Wise men =

Wise men or wise man may refer to:

- Hermits.
- Biblical Magi, who follow the Star of Bethlehem in the New Testament
- Sage (philosophy), a person who attained wisdom
- Sanxing (deities), personified deities of good fortune, prosperity, and longevity in Chinese Buddhism and Taoism
- The Wise Men (book), 1986 book about American foreign policy elders during the Cold War
- Wise Men (Nadler novel), 2013 novel by Stuart Nadler
- Wise Men of Gotham, early name for the people of Gotham, Nottinghamshire
- Wisemen (rap group), American hip-hop collective
- "Wisemen", 2005 pop rock song by Thelma Perez and Mark Anthony Rubion XB
- "Wise Man", a song by Five for Fighting from the 1997 album Message for Albert
- "Wiseman" (song), an unreleased song by Frank Ocean
- The Wise Man, a nickname of wrestling manager Paul Heyman
- "The Wise Man" (Bagpuss), a 1974 television episode
- Homo sapiens, calqued into English

== See also ==
- Three Wise Men (disambiguation)
- Wise guy (disambiguation)
- Wiseman (disambiguation)
