= WISE =

WISE may refer to:

== Arts, entertainment, and media ==
- WISE (AM), a radio station licensed to Asheville, North Carolina
- WISE-FM, a radio station licensed to Wise, Virginia
- WISE-TV, a television station licensed to Fort Wayne, Indiana

== Education ==
- Web-based Inquiry Science Environment, a program hosted by Berkeley University
- Wilberforce Institute for the study of Slavery and Emancipation, a research institute at University of Hull, England
- Wind Science and Engineering Research Center (WiSE), at Texas Tech University
- World Islamic Sciences and Education University, in Amman, Jordan

== Organisations and programmes ==
- WISE Campaign, an initiative to encourage women into science and engineering
- Women's Islamic Initiative in Spirituality and Equality, a religious organization based in the United States
- Work improvement in small enterprises, a programme for improvement of occupational health-and-safety conditions
- World Information Service on Energy, an international anti-nuclear network based in Amsterdam
- World Innovation Summit for Education, a global forum based in Doha, Qatar
- World Institute of Scientology Enterprises, a Church of Scientology organization

== Technology ==
- Wide-field Infrared Survey Explorer, a NASA-funded infrared-wavelength astronomical space telescope
- Wing-in-surface-effect, a type of ground effect vehicle
- Windows Interface Source Environment, a 1994 method for Microsoft Windows applications on other hosts
- WISE Installation System, Windows installation authoring software

== Transport ==
- West Ipoh Span Expressway, an expressway under construction in Ipoh, Malaysia

== See also ==
- Wise (disambiguation)
