= Weiss =

Weiss or Weiß may refer to:

== People ==
- Weiss (surname), including spelling Weiß
- Weiss Ferdl (1883-1949), German actor

== Places ==
- Mount Weiss, Jasper National Park, Alberta, Canada
- Weiss Lake, Alabama
- Weiß (Sieg), a river in North Rhine-Westphalia, Germany
- Weiss (river), a river in Haut-Rhin, France
- Weiss (crater), on the Moon

== In military affairs ==
- USS Weiss, several ships
- Fall Weiss, German military plan to conquer Poland
- Operation Weiss, 1943 German offensive in Yugoslavia

== Other uses ==
- Weiß, "first" album in Weiß & Schwarz pair of simultaneous Böhse Onkelz releases
- Nathan Weiss Graduate College, New Jersey, United States
- Weiss Amphitheater, a caldera in Marie Byrd Land, Antarctica
- Weiss Hall, a dormitory of Wilkes University, Wilkes-Barre, Pennsylvania, on the National Register of Historic Places
- Weiss, a fictional character in the light novel series The Saga of Tanya the Evil
- Weiss Schnee, a fictional character in the anime series RWBY

== See also ==
- Weisshorn, a mountain in the Alps
- Wheat beer or Weissbier, a type of beer
- Weis (disambiguation)
- Weise (disambiguation)
- Weisse (disambiguation)
- Weisz (disambiguation)
