= Wyse (disambiguation) =

Wyse was an American computer company.

Wyse may refer to:

- Arthur Bambridge Wyse (1909–1942), American astronomer
- John Wyse (died after 1499), Irish judge
- John Wyse (MP) (born about 1377), Member of Parliament for Bodmin
- John Wyse (actor) (1904–1989)
- Kenneth Wyse, Canadian drag queen
- Lois Wyse (1926–2007), author and cofounder of Wyse Advertising
- Peter Wyse Jackson (born 1955), botanist
- Thomas Wyse (1791–1862), diplomat
- Wyse (band), Japanese group
- WEZZ, a radio station (970 AM) licensed to serve Canton, North Carolina, United States, which held the call sign WYSE from 2006 to 2024
- Wyse (clothing)

== See also ==
- Wyze (disambiguation)
- Wyses Corner, Nova Scotia
- Worldwide Youth in Science and Engineering (WYSE)
