= BMW Z4 (G29) =

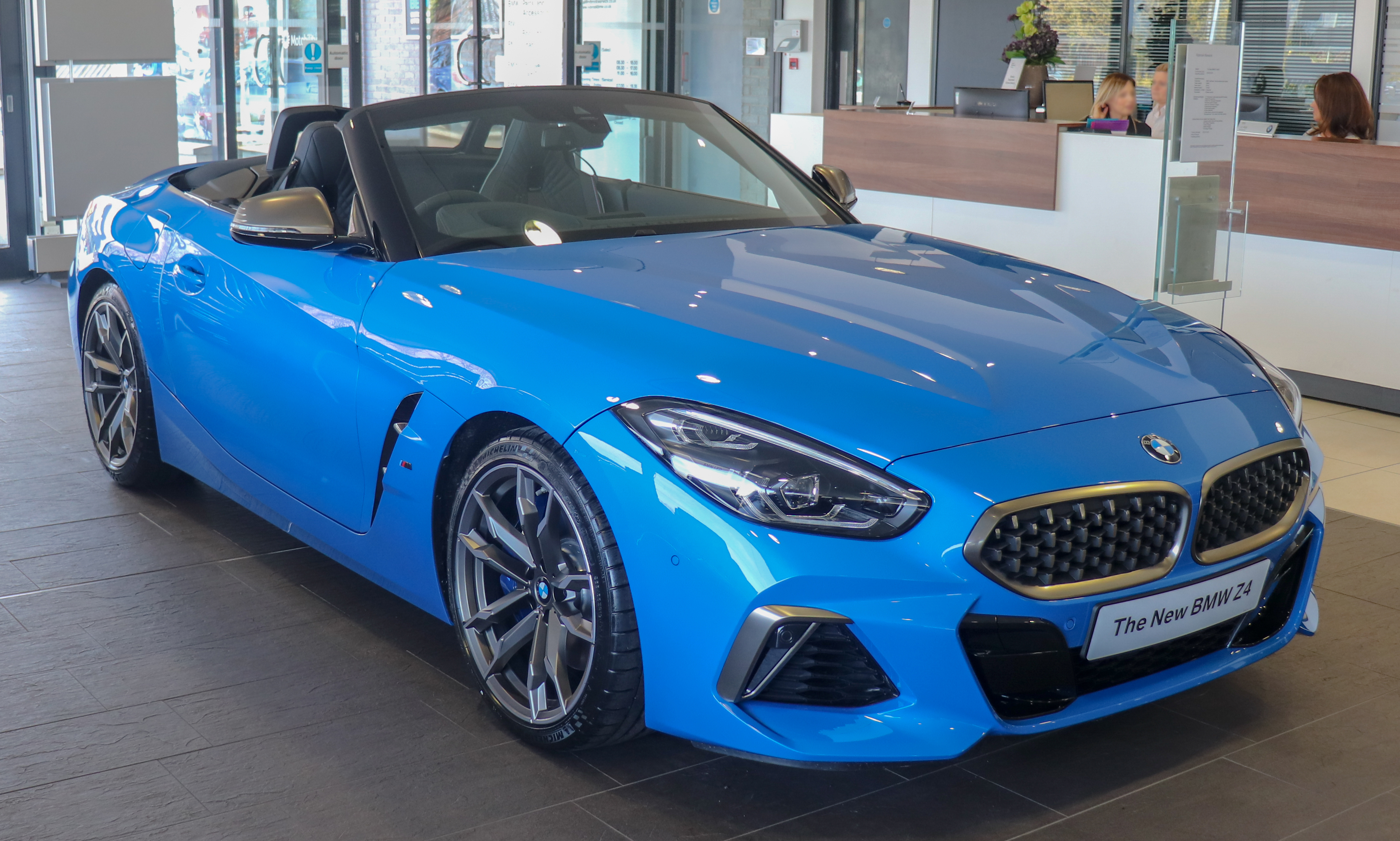
- Z4 M40i (UK, pre-facelift)

Overview
- Manufacturer: BMW
- Model code: G29
- Production: 2018–2026
- Model years: 2019–2026
- Assembly: Austria: Graz (Magna Steyr)
- Designer: Calvin Luk

Body and chassis
- Class: Sports car (S)
- Body style: 2-door roadster
- Layout: Front-engine, rear-wheel-drive
- Platform: Toyota-BMW joint sports car architecture
- Related: Toyota Supra (J29/DB); Boldmen CR4

Powertrain
- Engine: 2.0 L B48 turbocharged I4; 3.0 L B58 turbocharged I6
- Transmission: 8-speed ZF 8HP51 automatic; 6-speed manual

Dimensions
- Wheelbase: 2,470 mm (97.2 in)
- Length: 4,324 mm (170.2 in)
- Width: 1,864 mm (73.4 in)
- Height: 1,304 mm (51.3 in)
- Curb weight: 1,405–1,535 kg (3,097–3,384 lb)

Chronology
- Predecessor: BMW Z4 (E89)

The BMW Z4 (G29) is a roadster produced by German automobile manufacturer BMW. It was introduced in 2018 for the 2019 model year as a successor to the E89 Z4. As a fifth model in the lineage, the Z4 (G29) marks the return of the soft-top roof to the Z Series sports cars.

== Development and launch ==
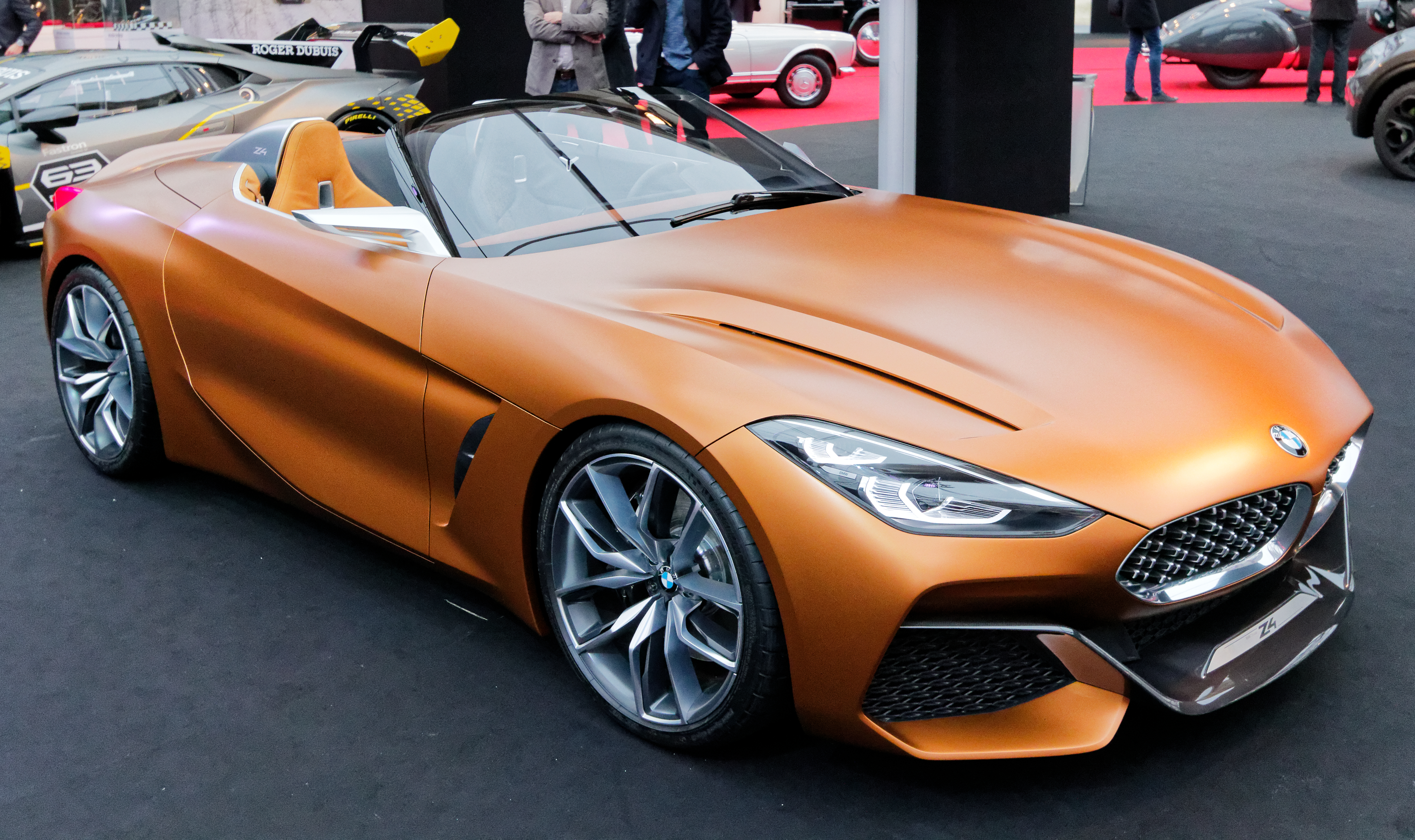
Z4 concept

The G29 Z4 was introduced at the Pebble Beach Concours d’Elegance on August 23, 2018.

Designed by Australian born Calvin Luk, the car is based on the Z4 Concept unveiled a year earlier, and was developed alongside the fifth-generation Toyota Supra due to BMW's partnership with Toyota. The design was inspired by the Z8. The G29 Z4 is based on the Toyota-BMW joint sports car architecture which also underpins the fifth-generation Supra and has a 50:50 weight distribution with weight savings of up to 50 kg (110 lb) as compared to its predecessor. The soft-top convertible roof returned on the Z4 (G29) instead of a retractable hardtop of its predecessor. The roof can be raised or lowered in 10 seconds at speeds of up to 50 km/h (31 mph). The boot is 50% larger than that of its predecessor and has a capacity of 281 litres (9.9 cu ft). It uses a multi-link rear suspension.

The official launch of the G29 Z4 took place at the 2018 Paris Motor Show in October. The car was available for sale in March 2019.

On March 11, 2022, Magna Steyr halted production of the BMW Z4 (along with the 5-Series) for two weeks due to the lack of components caused by the 2022 Russian invasion of Ukraine.

The LCI model was introduced in September 2022. The M Sport appearance package became standard across the range, although with several changes.

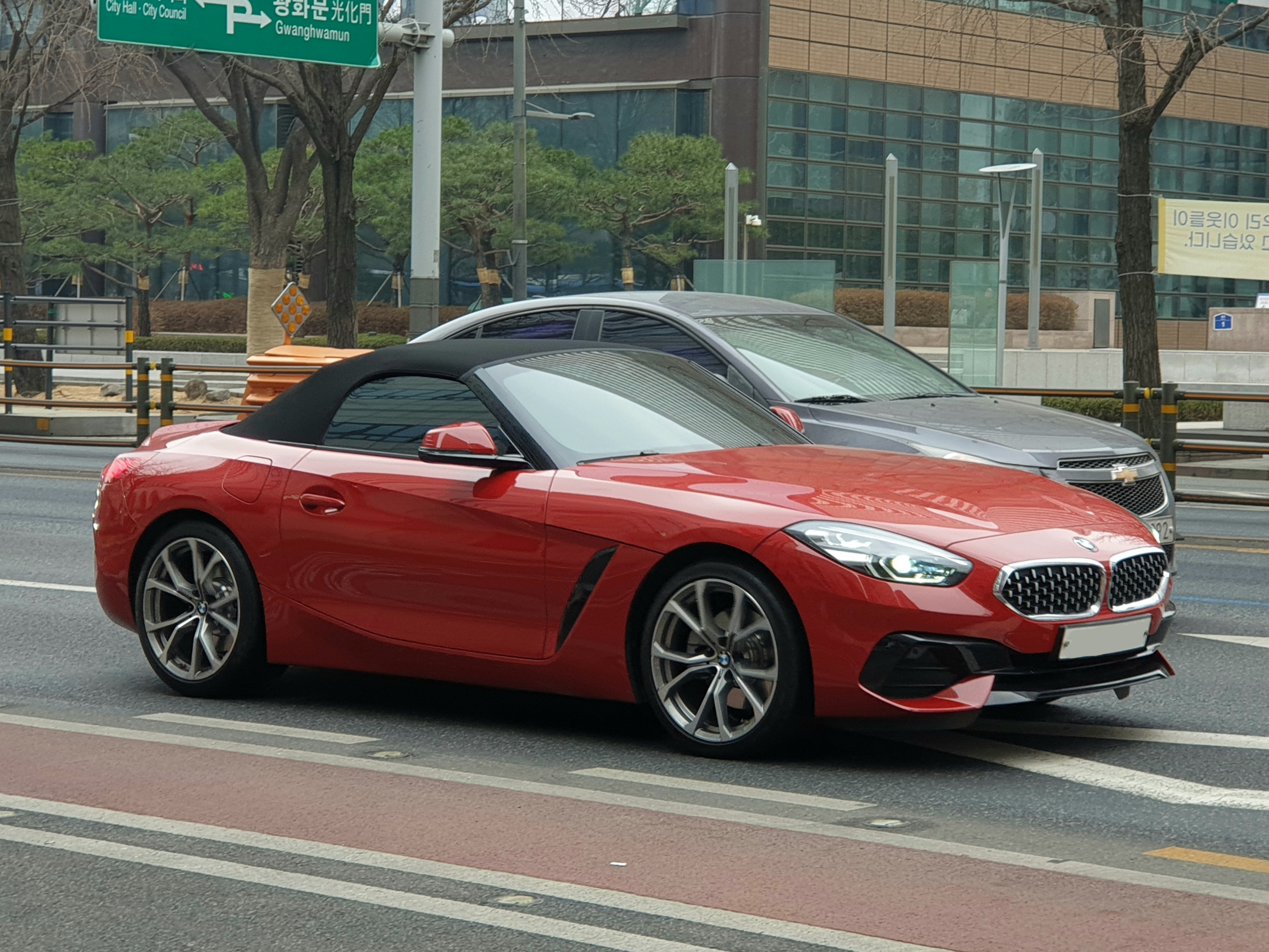
Z4 sDrive20i (South Korea) with standard appearance package

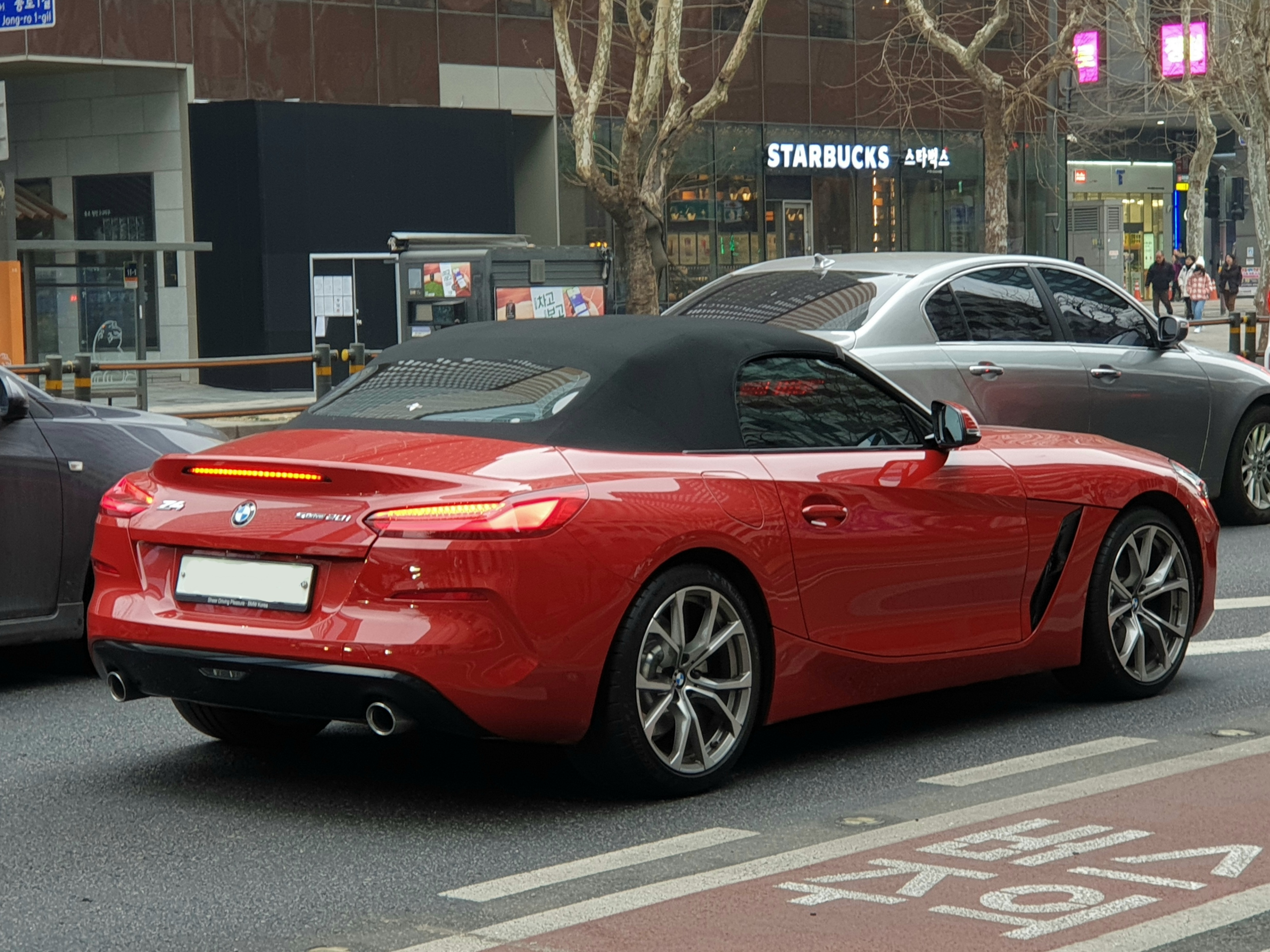
Z4 sDrive20i (South Korea) with standard appearance package

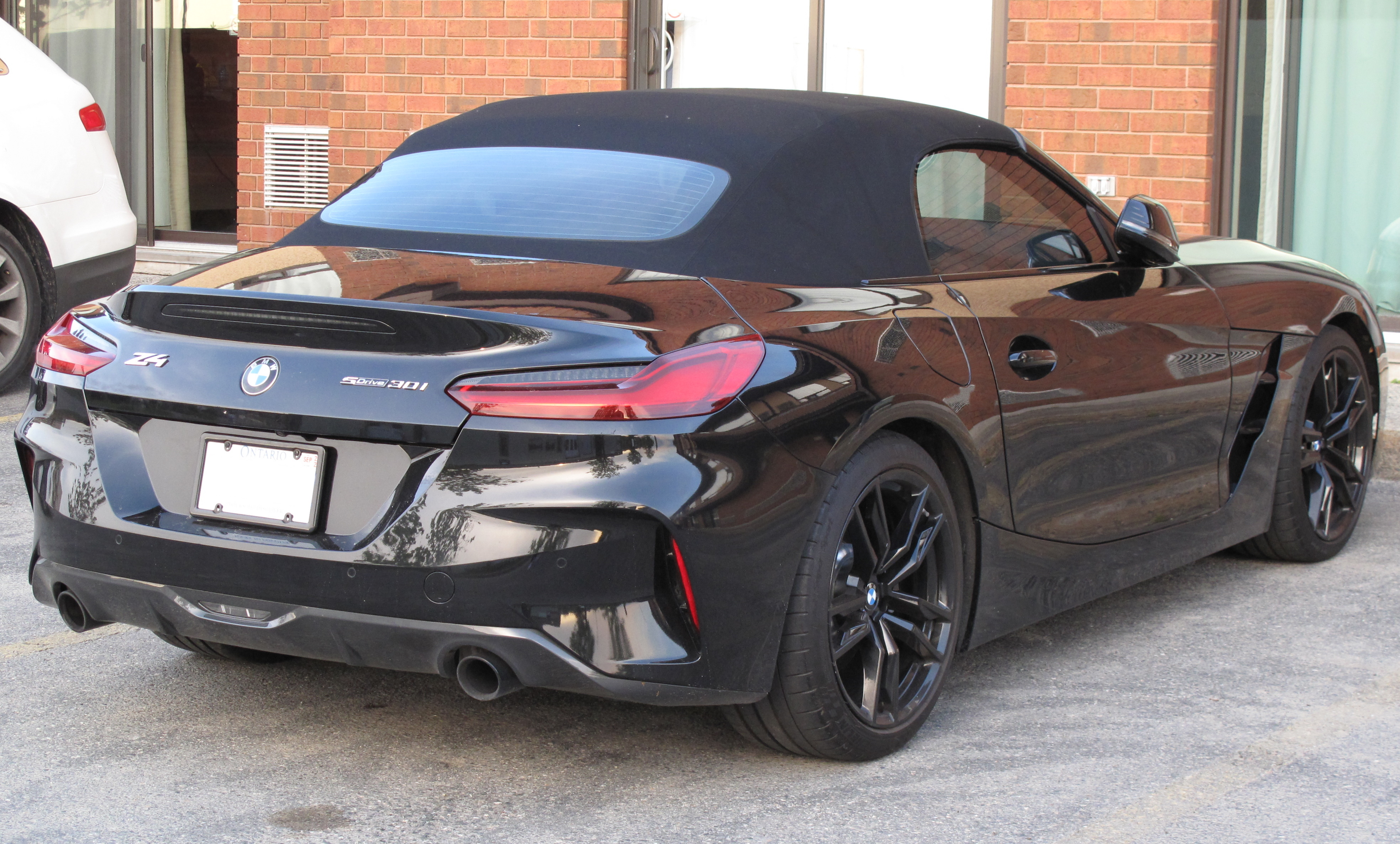
Z4 sDrive30i(Canada, pre-facelift) with M Sport appearance package

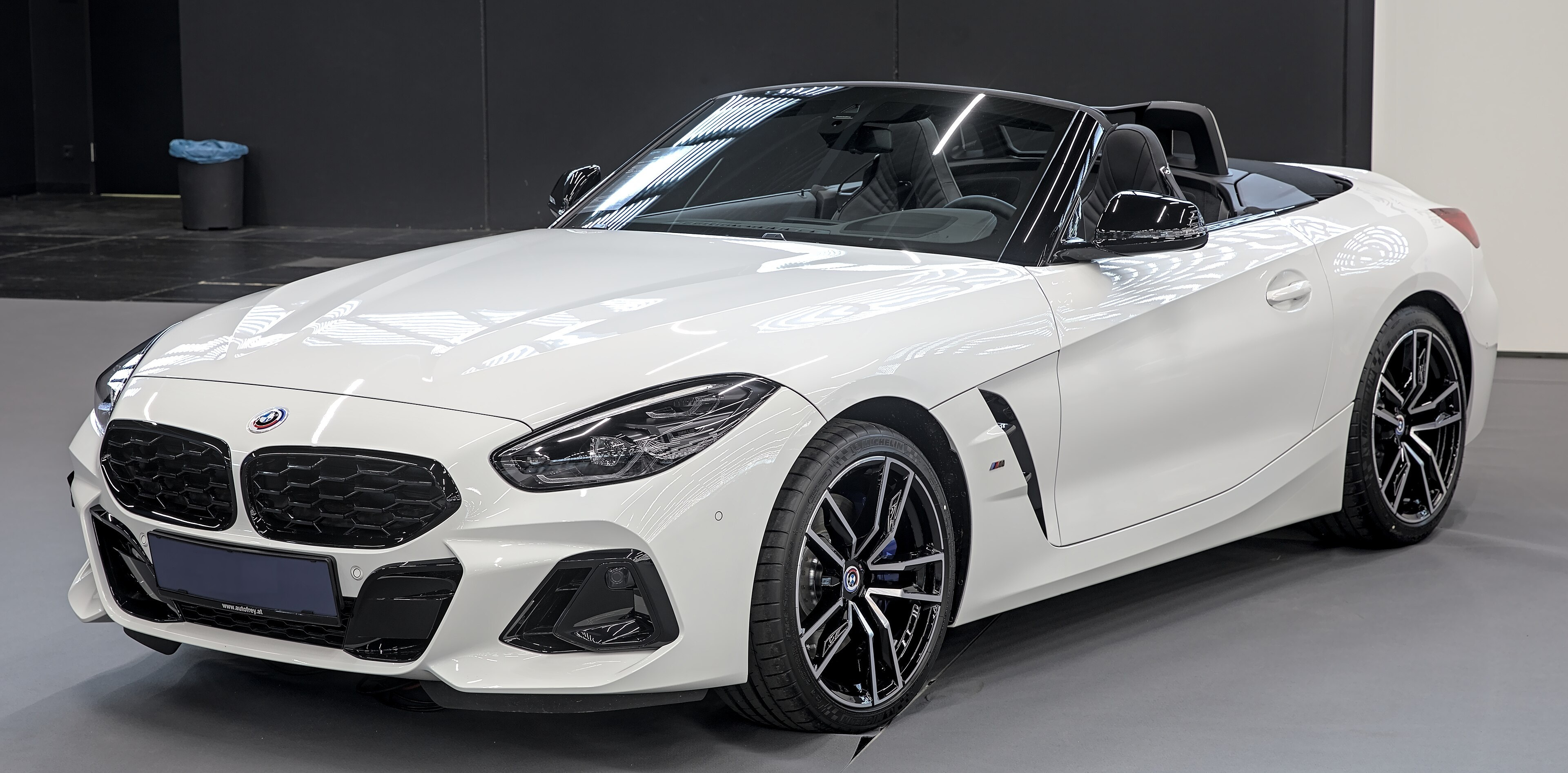
Z4 M40i (Austria, facelift)

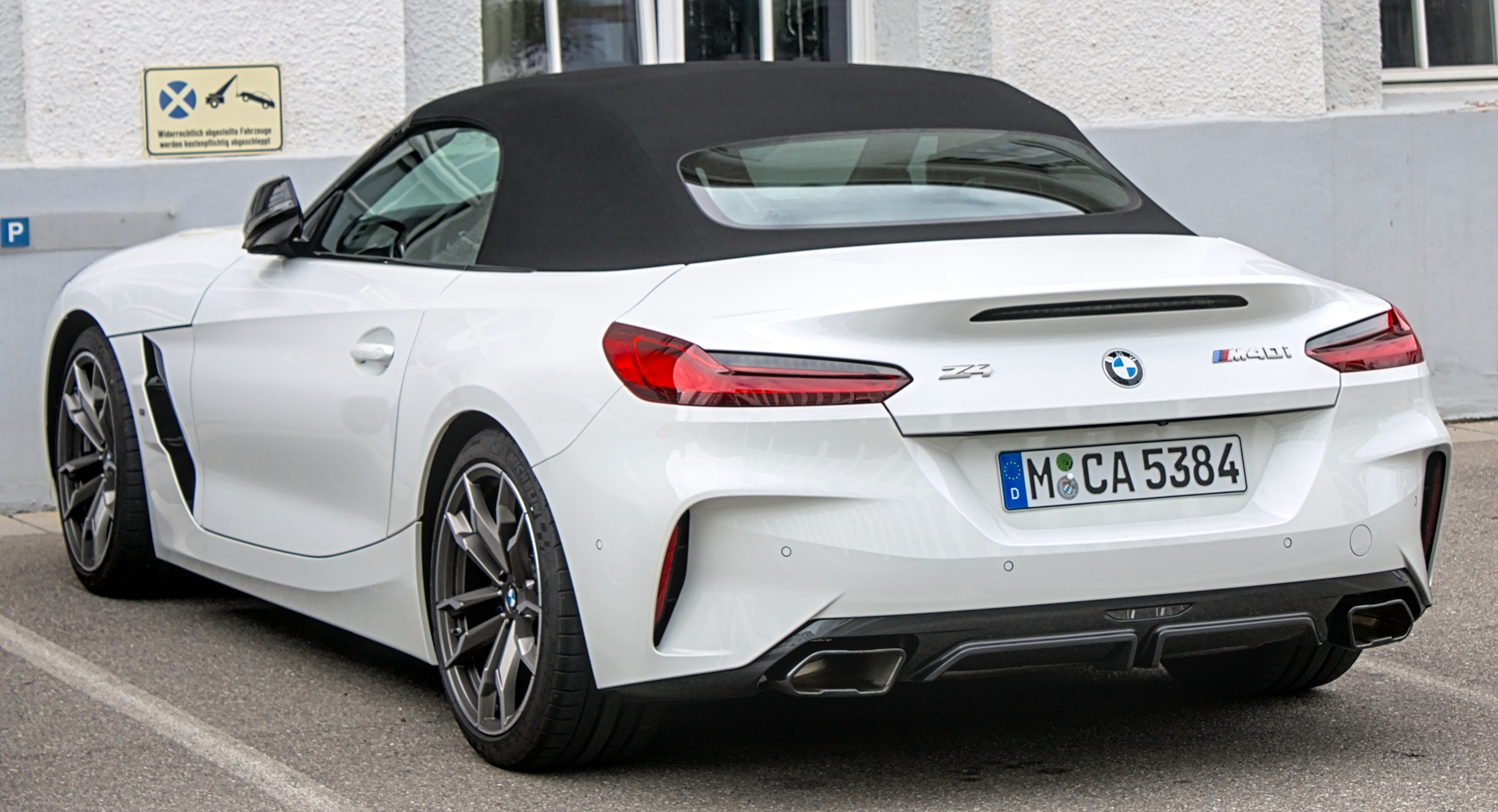
Z4 M40i (Germany), this appearance package was adopted to the facelifted model

== Equipment ==
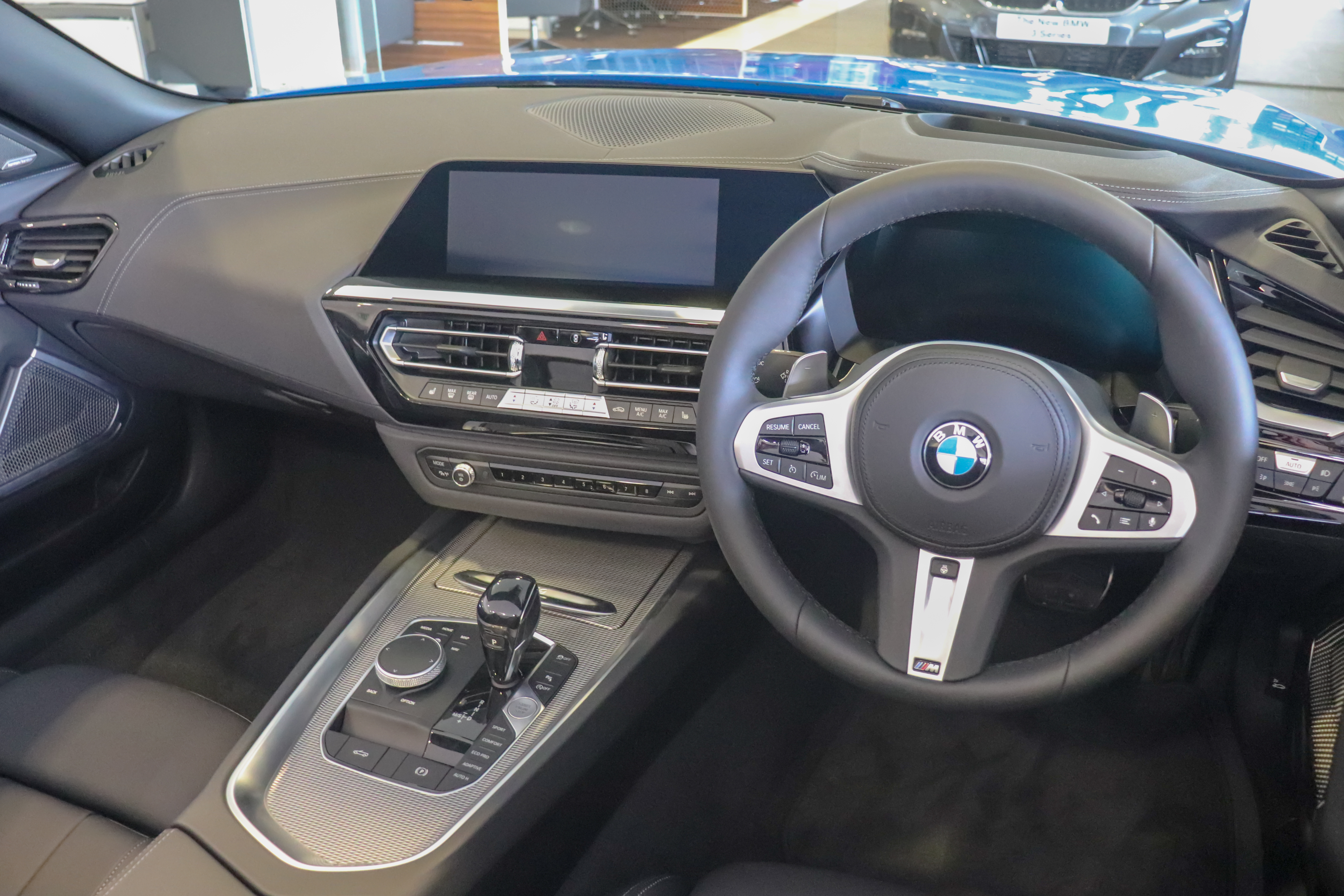
Interior

The sDrive models are available in a Sport line or the M Sport package. Available driver assistance systems include active cruise control, lane change warning system, a parking assistant, and collision warning with braking intervention.

The Z4 is offered with a 10.25-inch display with the iDrive 7.0. The car is available with BMW ConnectedDrive services which allow for over-the-air updates for the navigation maps and operating system. The digital key feature allows the car to be unlocked and started with a smartphone, and access can be shared with other people. It is also available with a customisable, digital instrument cluster (called BMW Live Cockpit Professional).

== Models ==
The launch model was the M40i First Edition which has Frozen Orange metallic paintwork and Vernasca leather, 19-inch alloy wheels, adaptive dampers, a Harman Kardon surround sound system and a head-up display.

The Z4 range consists of the sDrive 20i which is only available in selected markets, the sDrive 30i and the range topping M40i models. The sDrive models are powered by the 2.0-litre B48 straight-4 engine while the M40i is powered by the B58 straight-6 engine. All engines come with forced induction and are mated to an 8-speed automatic transmission. A 6-speed manual transmission was made available for only the sDrive 20i from July 2019.

In 2024 BMW announced that the 2025 BMW Z4 M40i will offer the Handschalter (German for "hand shift") package. This includes a 6 speed manual transmission, Extended Shadowline trim, exclusive black badging on the rear, Cognac leather upholstery and is also available in 2 exclusive colors San Remo Green or Frozen Deep Green along with the other colors available on the M40i.

Model	Years	Engine	Power	Torque	0–100 km/h (0–62 mph)
sDrive20i	2019–2026	B48B20; 2.0 L turbocharged I4	145 kW (197 PS; 194 hp) at 4,500–6,500 rpm	320 N⋅m (236 lb⋅ft) at 1,450–4,200 rpm	6.6 seconds
sDrive30i	2019–2026	B48B20; 2.0 L turbocharged I4	190 kW (258 PS; 255 hp) at 5,500–6,500 rpm	400 N⋅m (295 lb⋅ft) at 1,550–4,400 rpm	5.4 seconds
M40i	2019–2026	B58B30; 3.0 L turbocharged I6	250 kW (340 PS; 335 hp) at 5,500–6,500 rpm	500 N⋅m (369 lb⋅ft) at 1,600–4,500 rpm	4.2 seconds
M40i	2020–2026	B58B30; 3.0 L turbocharged I6	285 kW (387 PS; 382 hp) at 5,500–6,500 rpm	500 N⋅m (369 lb⋅ft) at 1,600–4,500 rpm	4.2 seconds

== Safety ==
The 2019 Z4 received five stars overall in its Euro NCAP test.

Euro NCAP test results BMW Z4 sDrive 30i (2019)
Test	Points	%
Overall:	5 /5 stars	
Adult occupant:	37.2	97%
Child occupant:	43	87%
Pedestrian:	44.1	91%
Safety assist:	10	76%

== Awards ==
- 2019 GQ 'The Sideways Is Best Award'
