= Boldmen CR4 =

German roadster, based on the BMW Z4

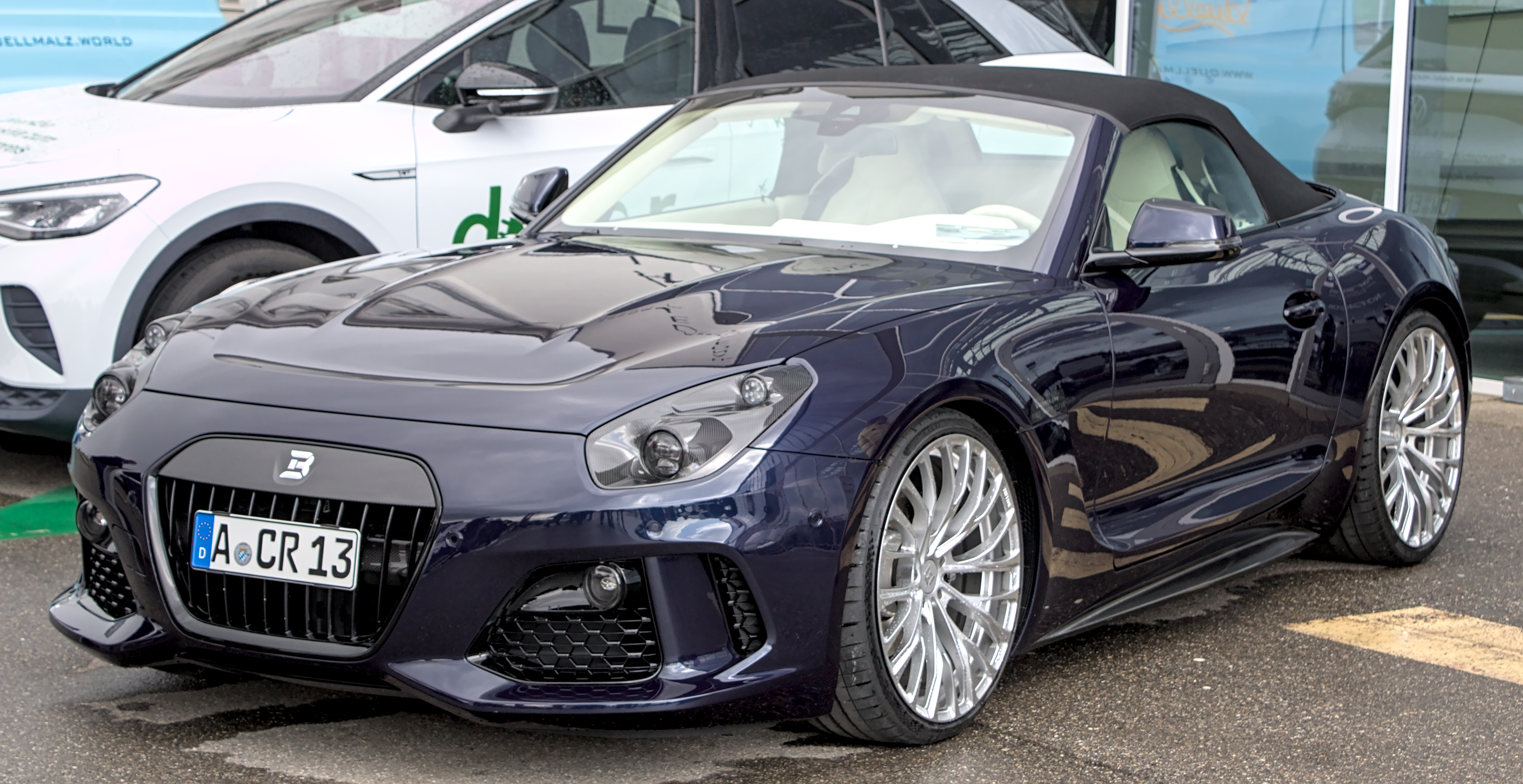

Overview
- Manufacturer: Boldmen
- Production: 2021–present
- Assembly: Germany: Welden

Body and chassis
- Class: Sports car (S)
- Body style: 2-door roadster
- Layout: Front-engine, rear-wheel-drive
- Platform: Cluster Architecture (CLAR)
- Related: Toyota GR Supra; BMW Z4 (G29)

Powertrain
- Engine: 3.0 L B58 turbocharged I6
- Transmission: 8-speed ZF 8HP45 automatic

Dimensions
- Wheelbase: 2,470 mm (97.2 in)
- Length: 4,324 mm (170.2 in)
- Width: 1,864 mm (73.4 in)
- Height: 1,304 mm (51.3 in)
- Curb weight: 1,495 kg (3,296 lb)

The Boldmen CR4 is a roadster produced by German automobile manufacturer Boldmen. It was introduced in 2021.

== Development and launch ==
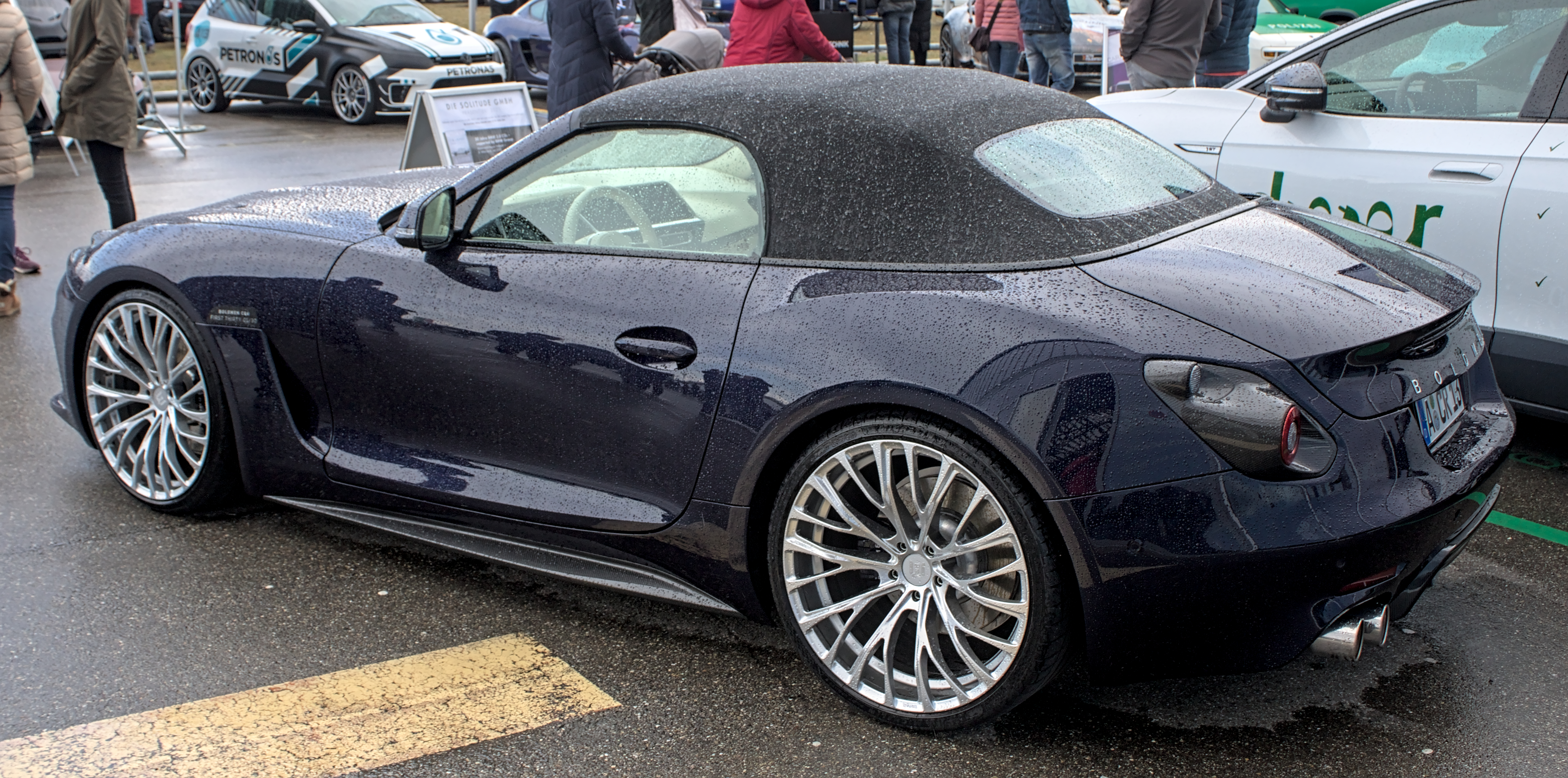
Rear view of the CR4

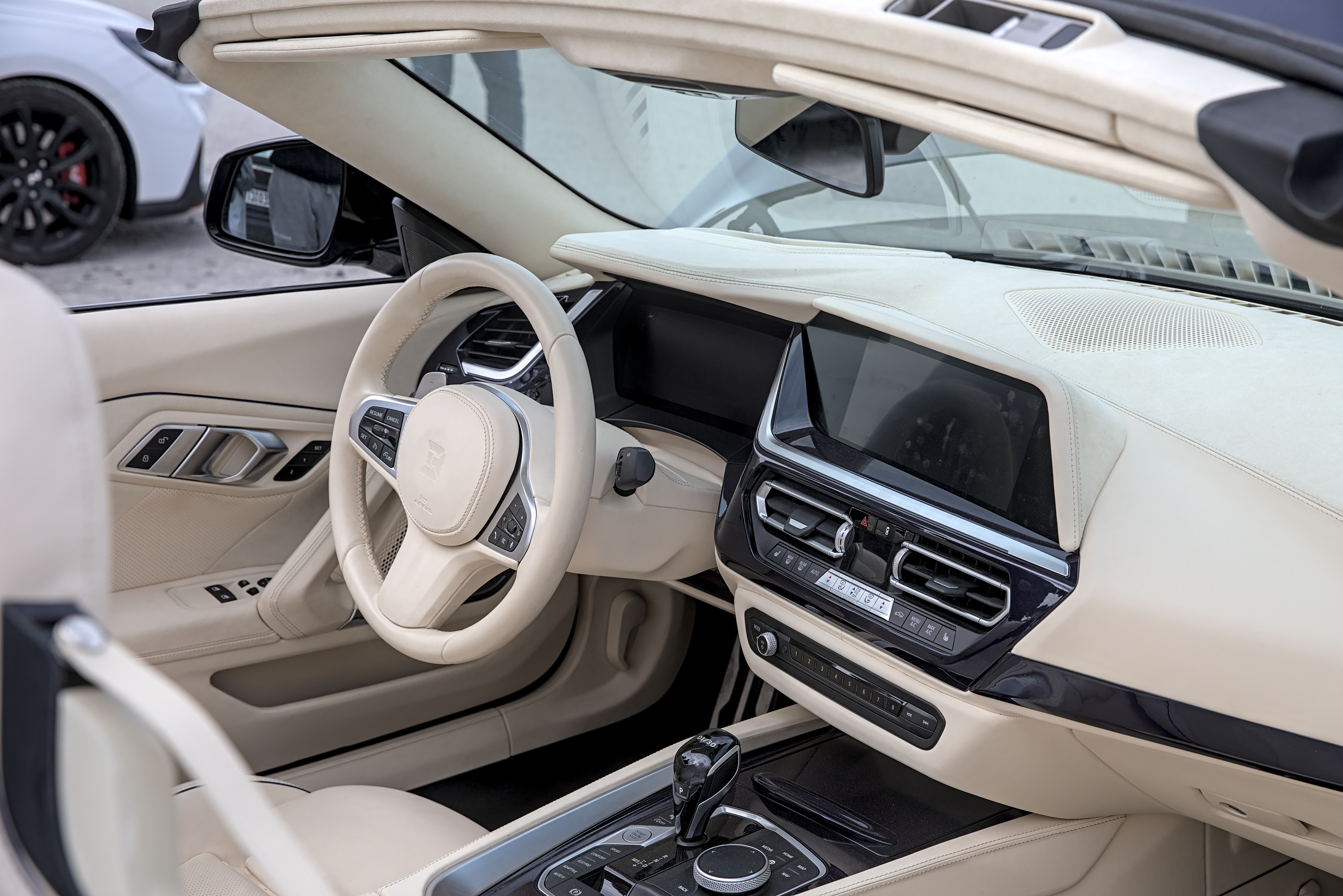
Interior

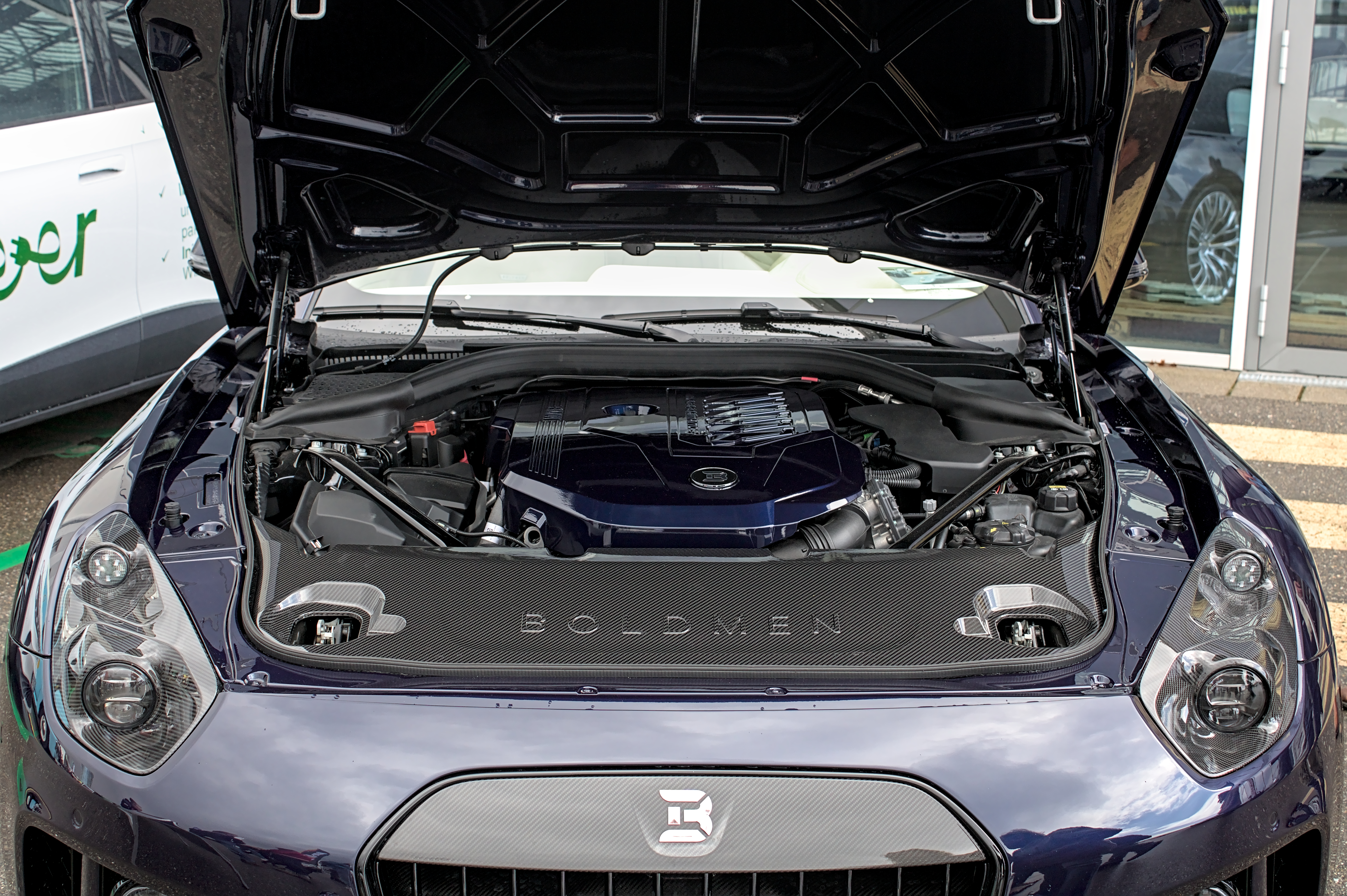
Engine compartment

In July 2021, Boldmen, which was founded a year earlier by Harald Käs, Michael Käs, and Friedhelm Wiesmann, presented its first car in the form of the two-door CR4 roadster. The third generation of the BMW Z4 was used as the basis for the development of the vehicle, visually significantly modifying it, also implementing proprietary technical changes.

The Boldmen has developed its own exterior design, with widely spaced headlamps as well as the distinctive hexagonal-shaped centrally located air intake. The rear part of the body has also undergone changes, with a widely spaced Boldmen inscription, as well as the pattern of the front part of the body - lamp shades with cased lenses. The BMW 3-liter six-cylinder B58 engine, which initially powers the Z4 in the M40i variant, has undergone extensive changes. As a result, the vehicle develops a maximum power of 300 kW (408 PS; 402 hp) and 610 N⋅m (450 lbf⋅ft) of torque, allowing it to reach an electronically limited top speed of 250 km/h (155 mph) and accelerate from 0-100 km/h (62 mph) in 3.9 seconds. The CR4 S variant has power upgraded to 368 kW; 493 hp (500 PS) and 700 N⋅m (516 lbf⋅ft) of torque, with an electronically limited top speed of 270 km/h (168 mph) and a 0-100 km/h (62 mph) time of 3.7 seconds. The exhaust system has been redesigned, leaving only the 8-speed automatic transmission unchanged.

== See also ==
- List of German cars
- Wiesmann
