= Wiseman =

Wiseman may refer to:

== Places ==
- Wiseman, Alaska, a US town
- Wiseman, Arkansas, a US town
- Wisemans Bridge, Pembrokeshire, Wales

== In fiction ==
- Wiseman, an antagonist of the second story arc in Sailor Moon
- Wiseman, an antagonist of the Japanese tokusatsu drama Kamen Rider Wizard
- Wiseman, an antagonist of the sixth story arc in Strike the Blood
- Wiseman, an antagonist in Armored Trooper Votoms
- Wizeman, an antagonist in Nights Into Dreams
- Wiseman, the title given to the winner of the Night Party in the light novel, manga, and anime Unbreakable Machine-Doll
- Professor Wiseman, a character in Curious George

== Other uses ==
- Wiseman (surname), includes a list of people with the surname Wiseman
- Wiseman hypothesis, a theory in Biblical criticism
- Müller-Wiseman Dairies, formerly known as Robert Wiseman Dairies, Scottish milk supplier and distributor
- "Wiseman" (song), an unreleased song by Frank Ocean
- Paul Heyman, American professional wrestling promoter nicknamed "The Wiseman"

== See also ==
- Wise men (disambiguation)
- Wiesmann, an automobile manufacturer
