= Matthäus Wieser =

Collector and songwriter of work songs

- Also known as: Matthai Wieser
- Born: 1617; Kraslice, Bohemia
- Died: 1678 (aged 60–61); Germany
- Occupation(s): Songwriter, miner

Matthäus Wieser (1617–1678) was a collector and songwriter of work songs, often for miners. He was sometimes known as Matthai Wieser.

== Life ==
Born in 1617 in Graslitz (Kraslice, near Hof), he lived later in Freiberg (Freiberg, and was last located in Germany). He died in 1678.

He was a miner and a songwriter (Bergsänger).

Miner-singers were miners who were deeply Christian. Other minersingers were Michael Bauer and Christian Gottlieb Lohse (1712–1754).

It is early work poetry and songwriting.

== Works ==
Christian songs for Miners

- O Bergwerksschöpfer höchster Gott
- Mit Freude will ich heben an
- Dem höchsten Gott so viel ich kann
- Freut euch sehr ihr Bergleut alle (from: Gesangbuch der luth. Landeskirche)
- Matthai Wiesers Geistlicher Brunqvell (Spiritual Water well)

He also collected songs

Other miner songs of unknown authorship

- Gott, der du Berg und Hügel
- Gnädigster Erbarmer
