= Smart aleck =

A smart aleck, smart alec or smart alek may refer to:

Smart aleck may refer to:

- Smart Alecks, a 1942 film starring the East Side Kids
- Smart Alec (1951 American film), a 1951 US pornographic film starring Candy Barr
- Smart Alec (1951 British film), a 1951 UK B-movie
- Smart Alec (1986 film), a 1986 film directed by Jim Wilson
- Smart Alek, a 1993 film directed by Andrew Kötting
- Smart Alex, a 1985 album by The Adicts
- Smart Alec (comics), a Marvel Comics super villain
