= Hartwig Friedrich Wiese =

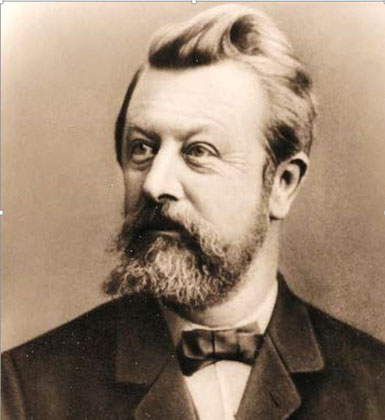

Hartwig Friedrich "Fritz" Wiese (13 May 1840 – 6 February 1905) was a German engineer and naturalist. He also wrote a history of his native town of Schönkirchen.

Wiese was born in Schönkirchen to farm worker and bailiff Hans Hinrich Wiese and Magdalene née Dibbern. His grandfather Peter had a library where Wiese's interest in natural history was sparked. His teachers Jes Petersen and Hans Peter Ewoldt strengthened his interest in the natural sciences. He studied Latin under Pastor Carl Friedrich Mertz and he went to study a one-year seminar in mathematics at Oelixdorf. In 1859 he moved to the Hanover Polytechnic and graduated in 1861 as an engineer and worked in Hanover, Westphalia and from 1867 he worked on the construction of the Venloer-Hamburg railway line. In 1882 he returned to his village as his father had died and he began to work on the family farm and began to study natural history in the spare time. He grew a large collection beetles, bird eggs, reptiles and smaller mammals. Karl August Möbius from the University of Kiel came on excursions with his students several times and visited Wiese. Wiese also took an interest in Goethe's writings, travelled to zoological museums in Europe, and began to research the history of Schönkirchen in 1884. In 1885 he served as parish bailiff, and as arbitrator from 1887. He died after falling on ice and died from internal bleeding. He willed that he be buried without a eulogy. His zoological collections were bequeathed to museums in Kiel and Sofia and his archaeological collections are now part of a local museum.
