= Wyze =

Wyze or WYZE may refer to:

- WYZE (AM), a radio station in Atlanta, Georgia, United States
- Wyze Labs, a company based in Seattle, Washington, United States
- Project Wyze, a Canadian rap metal band
