= Wiesmann GmbH =

German niche automobile manufacturer

- Type: Public (GmbH & Co. KG)
- Industry: Automotive
- Founded: 1988
- Founder: Martin Wiesmann; Friedhelm Wiesmann
- Headquarters: Dülmen, Germany 51°50′40.04″N 7°17′30.24″E
- Key people: Roheen Berry (CEO)
- Products: Hand-built custom convertibles
- Website: www.wiesmann.com

Wiesmann GmbH is a German automobile manufacturer that specializes in hand-built custom convertibles and coupes. Brothers Martin Wiesmann and Friedhelm Wiesmann founded the company in 1988 which has its headquarters located in Dülmen. The business was temporarily closed in May 2014, and following a buyout by London-based investor Roheen Berry who took over as CEO, it is set to return with a new model, powered by a BMW M division-sourced V8 engine. The relaunch of the Wiesmann brand has more than one model, including an electric vehicle, in the pipeline and the pre-development phase of the car has been completed. A teaser video of the brand's rebirth, posted on their website, tells viewers to “expect the unexpected”.

In its previous era, Wiesmann used BMW's six-cylinder engines to power its MF models until the introduction in 2003 of the GT MF4, which used BMW's 4.8-litre V8, and the MF5, which used the M5's 5.0-litre V10.

== History ==
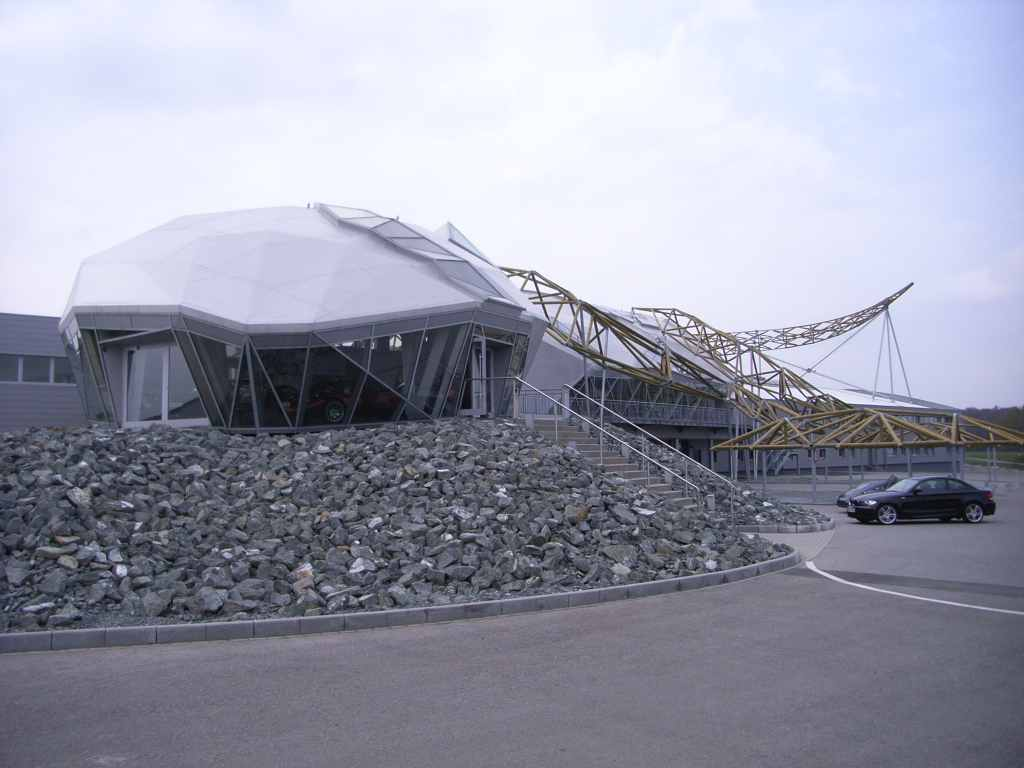
Wiesmann's gecko logo was incorporated into the design of its factory in Dülmen, Germany.

The company's first roadster left the workshop in 1993. By 2006, they were producing the Wiesmann MF3 and MF30 roadsters and the Wiesmann GT MF4 coupé, all of which utilized engine and transmission components supplied by BMW. The company, which made around 180 hand-built cars each year, used a gecko logo because they claimed their cars "stick to the road like geckos to a wall"

By 2010, Wiesmann planned to begin exporting vehicles to the US. Factors including poor exchange rates and the high costs of modifying and testing cars to meet US automotive regulations hindered these plans. On August 14, 2013, Wiesmann filed for insolvency at the local court in Münster. Four months later, Wiesmann's management board filed to dismiss the insolvency proceedings due to abolition of the insolvency reasons, while the creditors’ meeting was also postponed. A UK-based consortium was interested in taking over Wiesmann and resuming production, but the company was closed a month later. London-based investor Roheen Berry bought out the company and became its CEO.

In 2022, Wiesmann announced they were entering the electric sports car market. Production of the zero-emission Thunderball will start in the 2024 model year with the entire first year's run already sold out.

== MF30 / MF3 ==
=== MF30 ===
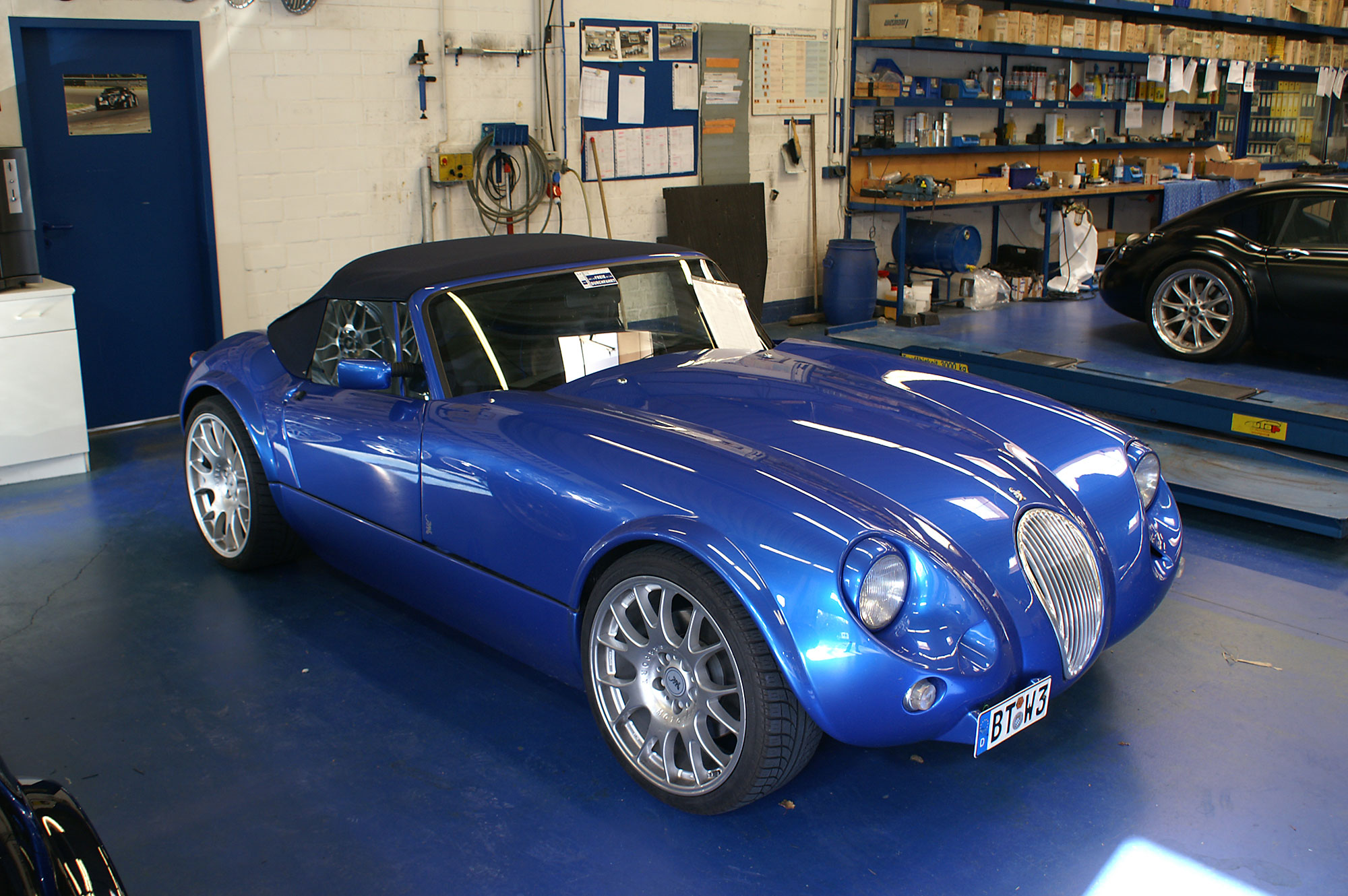
Wiesmann MF30

The Wiesmann MF30 is the first Wiesmann model ever built, with cars entering production in 1993.

The MF30 is powered by a six-cylinder M54B30 engine borrowed from BMW, with a capacity of 2979 cm^{3} and a power output of 170 kW (228 hp; 231 PS) at 5,900 rpm and 300 N⋅m (221 ft⋅lbf) of torque at 3,400 rpm. It has a dry weight of 1,080 kg (2,381 lb) and can accelerate from 0 to 60 mph (97 km/h) in 5.9 seconds, with a top speed of 230 km/h (143 mph).

The model was discontinued in order to give way to the new, slightly modified model named MF3.

==== Specifications ====
Chassis	Hot-dipped galvanized steel, aluminum clad
Body	fiber glass reinforced composite material
Engine	BMW 6-cylinder engine – Capacity 2979 cm^{3}
	Rated power/rated speed 170 kW (228 hp; 231 PS) @ 5,900 rpm
	max. torque/speed 300 N⋅m (221 ft⋅lbf) @ 3,400 rpm
Fuel Consumption	City 12.8 L/100 km (22.1 mpg_{‑imp}; 18.4 mpg_{‑US}) - Highway 6.9 L/100 km (41 mpg_{‑imp}; 34 mpg_{‑US})
	Combined 9.1 L/100 km (31 mpg_{‑imp}; 26 mpg_{‑US})
Transmission	5-speed or 6-speed manual or 6-speed sequential (SMG II)
Power Train	Rear wheel drive
Performance	Maximum speed: 230 km/h (143 mph)
	Acceleration: 0 –100 km/h (62 mph): 5.0 sec.
Suspension	MacPherson strut front suspension with transverse link, stabilizer
	Central control arm rear axle with leading and transverse link, stabilizer
Weight	1,080 kg (2,381 lb)
Dimensions	Length: 3.86 m (152 in) / Width: 1.75 m (69 in) / Height: 1.16 m (46 in)

=== MF3 ===
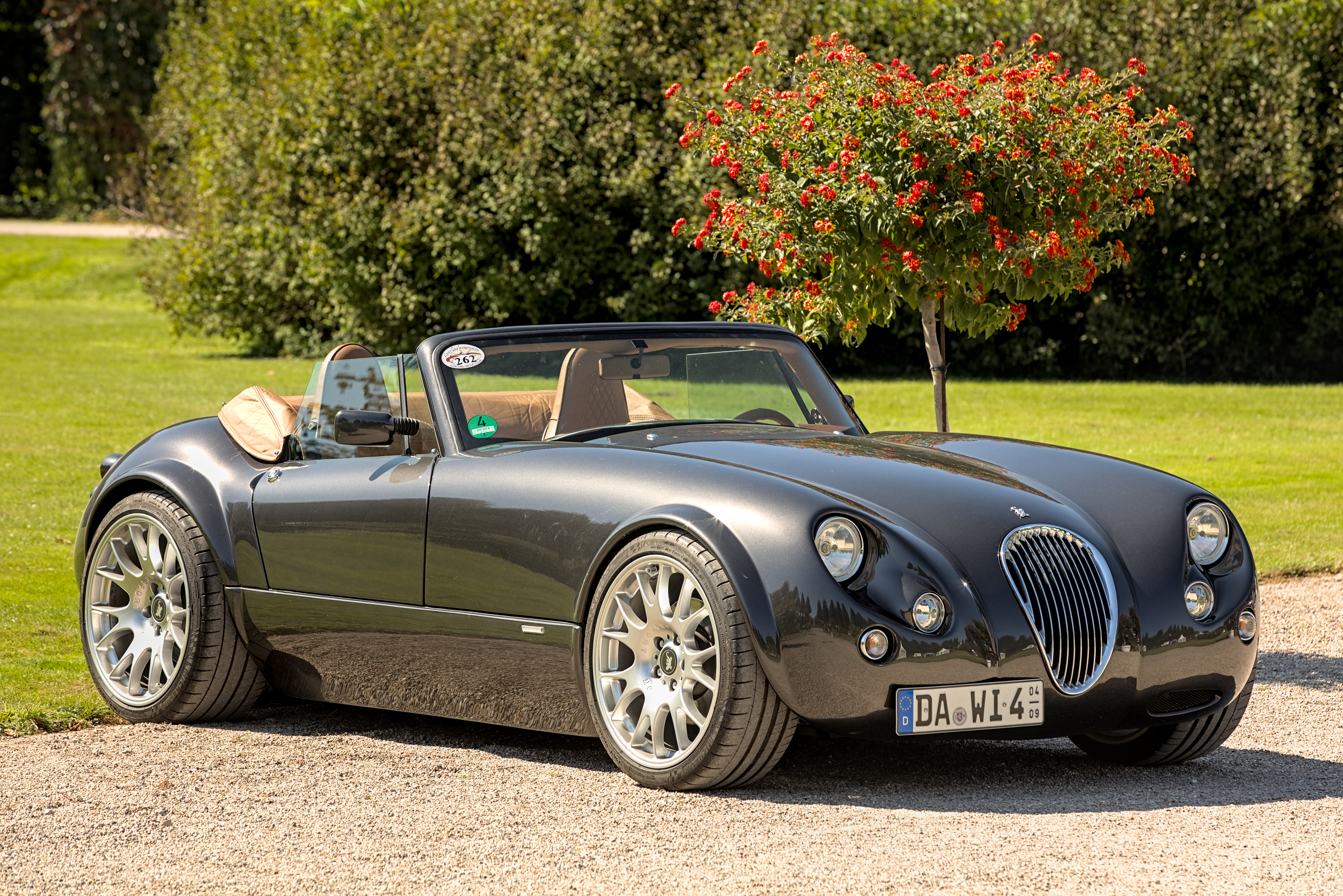
Wiesmann MF3

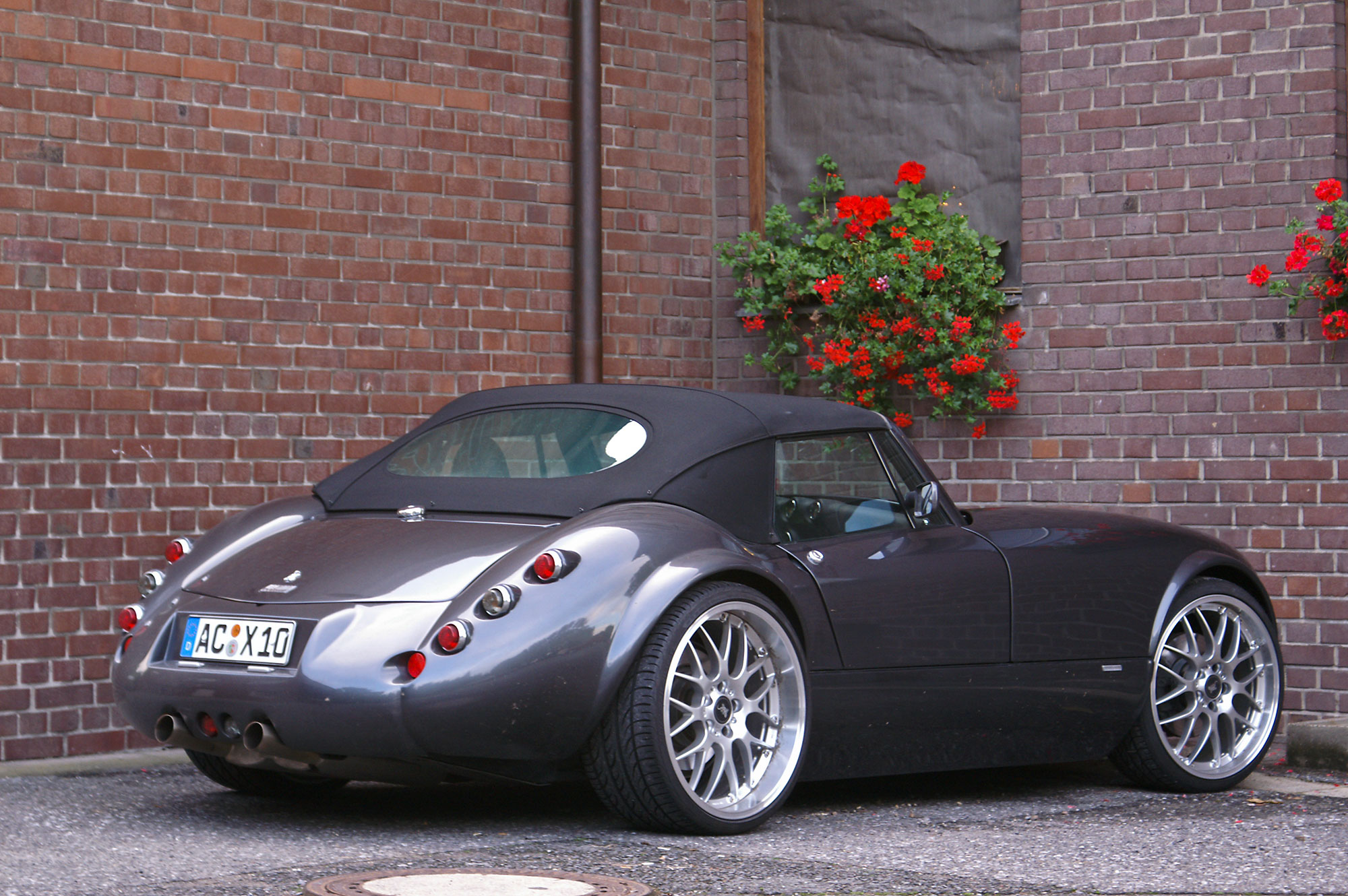
Wiesmann MF3

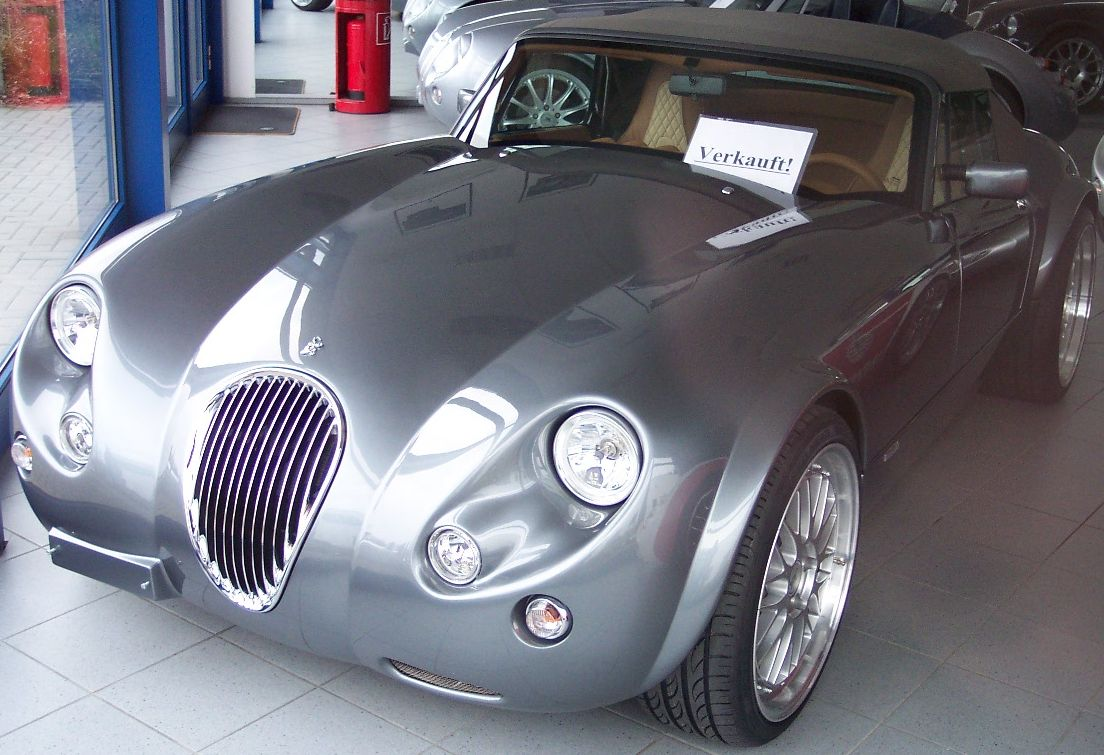
Wiesmann MF3

The primary difference between the MF3 and the MF30 was the new engine. The engine featured on the MF3 was a BMW S54, which is originally from the M3 (E46). The engine has a displacement of 3246 cc with a maximum power output of 252 kW (338 hp; 343 PS) at 7900 rpm, and a maximum torque of 365 N⋅m (269 ft⋅lbf) at 4900 rpm. With the new engine and due to its weight of 1,180 kg (2,601 lb), this car can accelerate from 0–60 mph (97 km/h) in 5.0 sec and reaching a maximum speed of 255 km/h (158 mph). The MF3 came with a five-speed manual transmission as basic, and a six-speed sequential gearbox as an option. Another additional option were the 20-inch rims running on (front: 235/30/20, rear: 285/25/20) rubber.

==== Specifications ====
Chassis	Hot-dipped galvanized steel, aluminum clad
Body	fibre glass reinforced composite material
Engine	BMW S54 – Capacity 3246 cc
	Rated power/rated speed 252 kW / 343 hp @ 7900 rpm
	max. torque/speed 365 N⋅m (269 ft⋅lbf) @ 4900 rpm
Fuel Consumption	City 17.8 L/100 km (15.9 mpg_{‑imp}; 13.2 mpg_{‑US}) - Highway 8.4 L/100 km (34 mpg_{‑imp}; 28 mpg_{‑US})
	Combined 11.1 L/100 km (25 mpg_{‑imp}; 21.2 mpg_{‑US})
Transmission	5-speed or 6-speed manual or 6-speed sequential (SMG II)
Power Train	Rear wheel drive
Performance	Maximum speed: 255 km/h (158 mph)
	Acceleration: 0–100 km/h: 5.0 sec.
Suspension	MacPherson strut front suspension with transverse link, stabilizer
	Central control arm rear axle with leading and transverse link, stabilizer
Weight	1,180 kg (2,601 lb)
Dimensions	Length: 3.86 m (152 in) / Width: 1.75 m (69 in) / Height: 1.16 m (46 in)
Price	~£90,000

=== Other models ===
Other variants exist, such as the MF25-4, MF28 and the MF35.

== MF4 ==
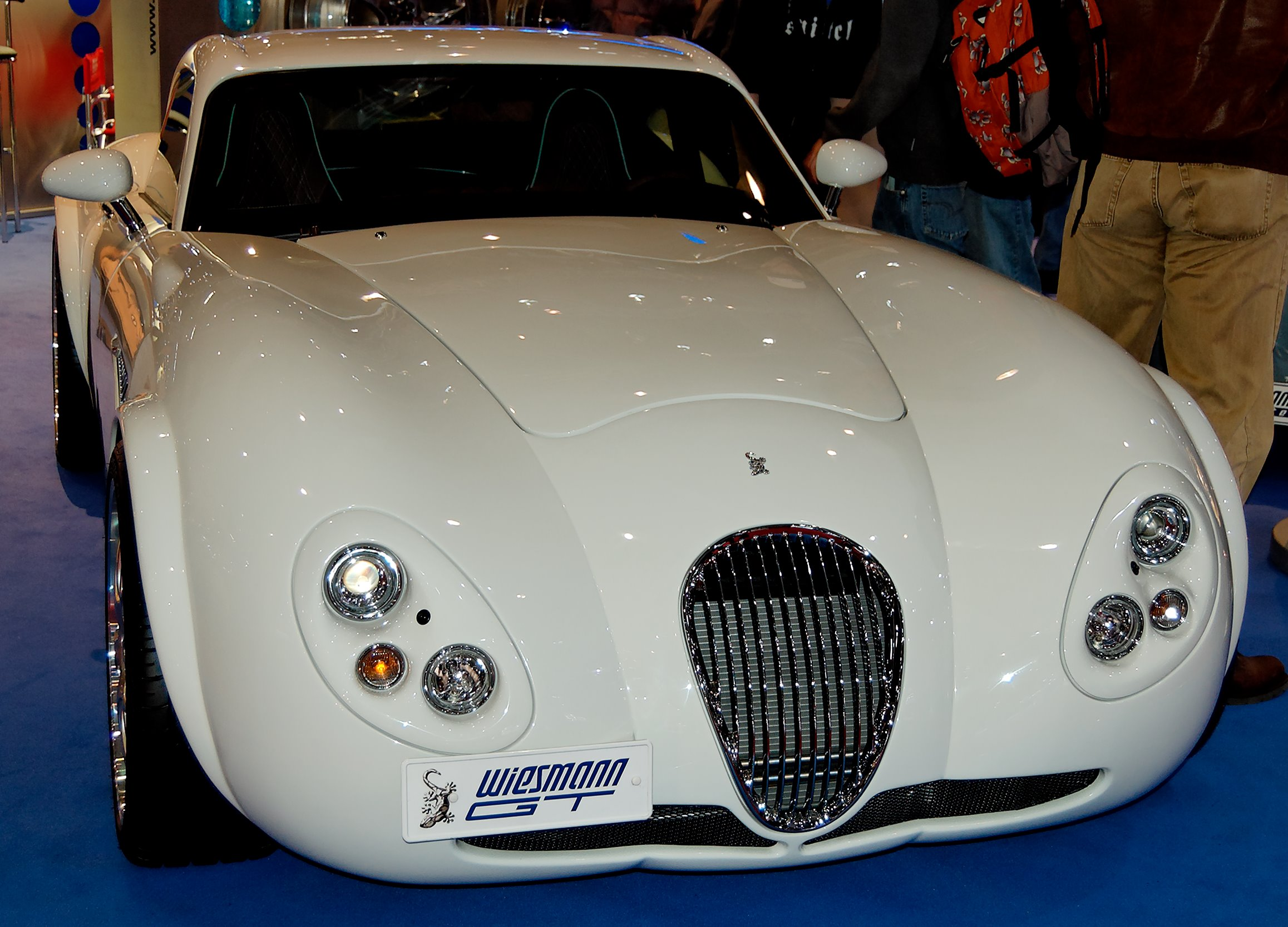
Wiesmann GT MF4 at the 2006 Geneva Motor Show

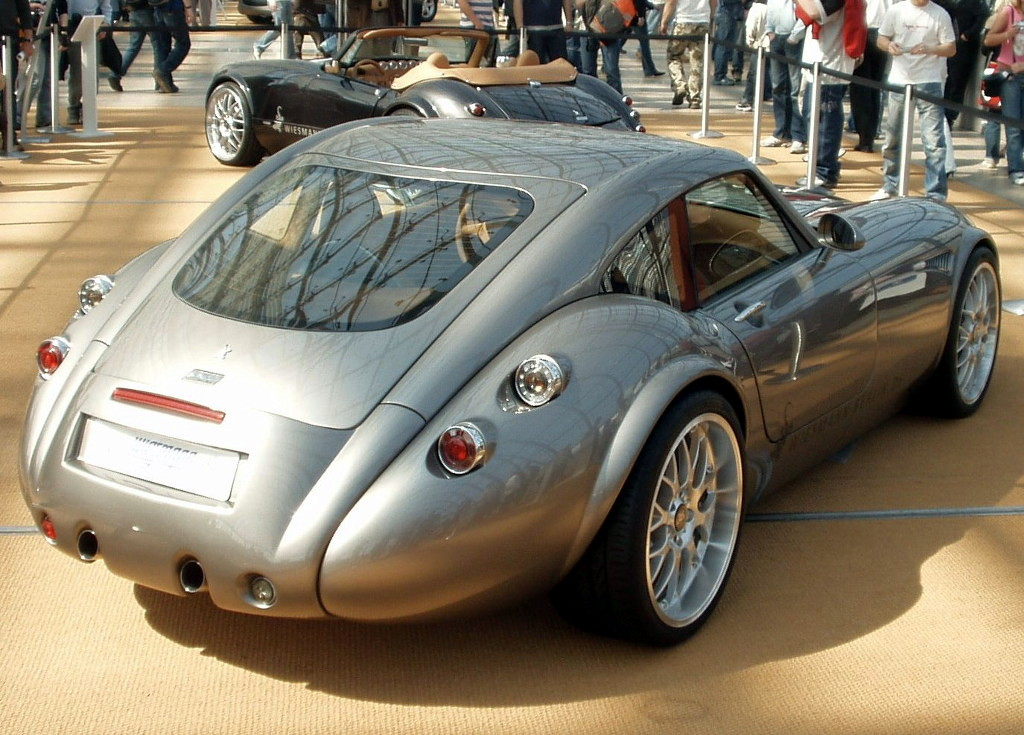
Wiesmann GT MF4

The GT MF4 is a closed two-seater with more power than the other models, intended for long distance touring. The first edition GT MF4 was produced from 2003 to 2009.

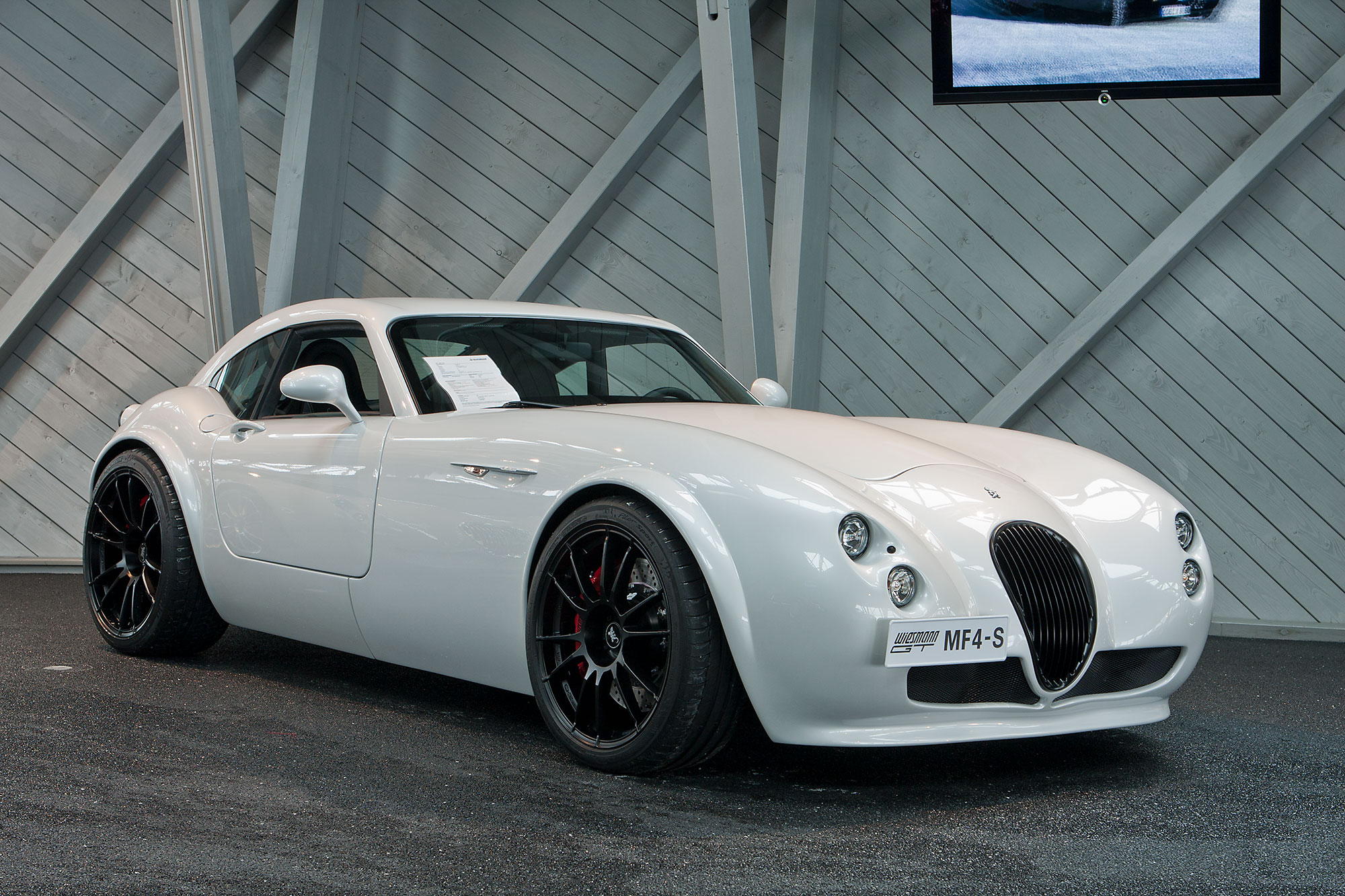
Wiesmann GT MF4-S

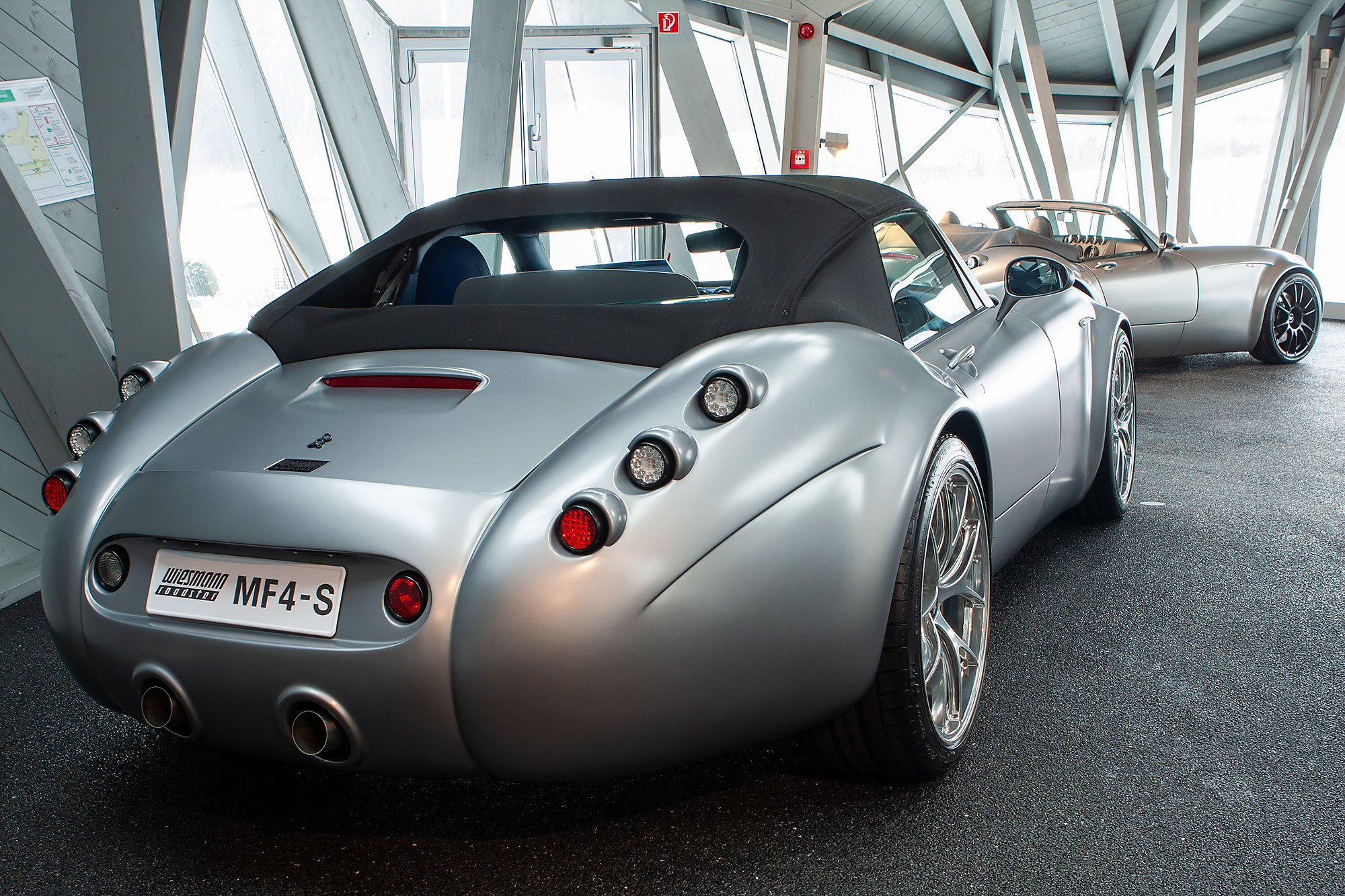
Wiesmann Roadster MF4-S

At the 2009 Geneva Motorshow Wiesmann revealed the Roadster MF4 and Roadster MF4-S, which featured facelifted bodywork and an updated engine choice.

In 2010, also at Geneva, they updated their coupe, with the GT MF4-S. This also had modernized bodywork, including modernized headlights and automated retracting spoiler.

Wiemann released their most exclusive model, the GT MF4-CS, at the 2013 Geneva Motorshow. This was a track-focused lightweight limited edition car, with only 25 slated for production. It differed from the standard cars with a 40kg weight reduction, a pared back interior and more aggressive bodywork for better aerodynamics, paired to the MF4-S drivetrain for better performance.

=== Specifications ===
Chassis	Aluminum
Body	Fiber glass reinforced composite material
Engine	naturally aspirated 4.8L (367 HP/270 kW) V8 BMW engine BMW N62 naturally aspirated 4.0L (420 HP/309 kW) V8 BMW engine BMW S65B40 (MF4-S)
	Rated power/rated speed 270 kW (367 PS; 362 hp) @ 6,300 rpm 309 kW (420 PS; 414 hp) @ 8,300 rpm (MF4 S)
	Max. torque/speed 490 N⋅m (361 lb⋅ft)) @ 3,400 rpm 400 N⋅m (295 lb⋅ft) @ 3,900 rpm (MF4 S)
Fuel Consumption	City 17.2 L/100 km (16.4 mpg_{‑imp}; 13.7 mpg_{‑US}) - Highway 9.4 L/100 km (30 mpg_{‑imp}; 25 mpg_{‑US})
	Combined 12.3 L/100 km (23.0 mpg_{‑imp}; 19.1 mpg_{‑US})
Transmission	6-speed sports automatic
Power Train	Rear wheel drive
Performance	Maximum speed: 291 km/h (181 mph)
	Acceleration: 0–100 km/h (62 mph): 4.6 sec.
Suspension	Single wheel suspension front and rear
	front: aluminium double transverse link
	rear: aluminium double transverse link with trailing link
Weight	1,390 kg (3,064 lb)
Dimensions	Length: 4.23 m (167 in) / Width: 1.85 m (73 in) / Height: 1.19 m (47 in)

== MF5 ==
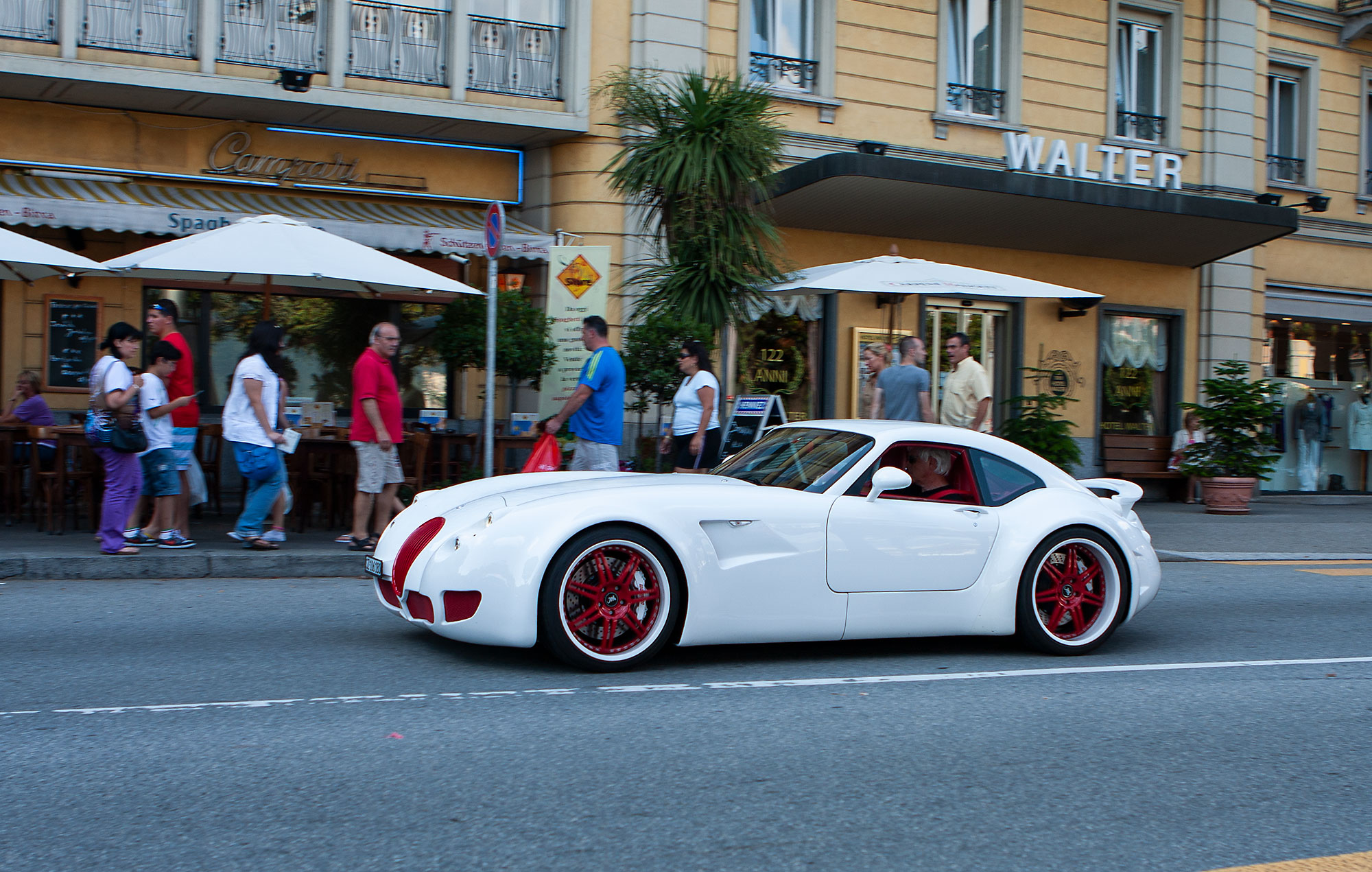
Wiesmann GT MF5 Coupe

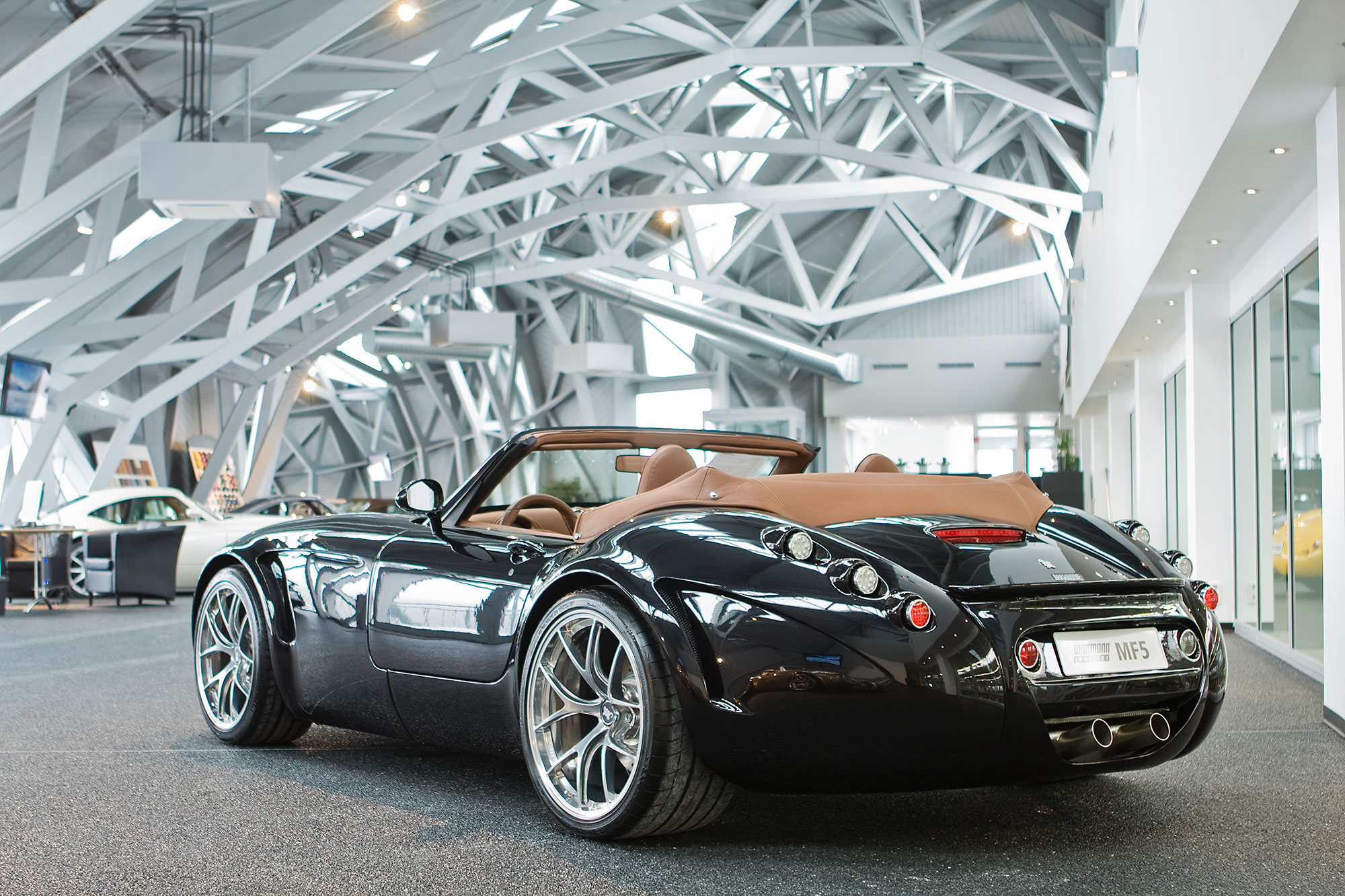
Wiesmann Roadster MF5 V10

The GT MF5 & the Roadster MF5 are two-seater cars with more power than previous models. The GT MF5 was released at the 2008 Geneva Motorshow, followed by the Roadster MF5 at Frankfurt IAA in 2009.

Fewer than 200 MF5 cars were produced in total. Although the roadster was limited to just 55 cars, only 43 were manufactured before the company ceased production.

=== Specifications ===
Chassis	Aluminium-monocoque, bonded and riveted
Body	glass fiber bodyshell
Engine	BMW S85 V10 – Capacity 5000 cc BMW S63B44O0 V8 Twin-turbo – Capacity 4.4 L (4,395 cc) (2011–2014)
	Rated power/rated speed 373 kW (500 hp; 507 PS) @ 7,500 rpm 408 kW (547 hp; 555 PS) @ 6,000 rpm (2011–2014)
	Max. torque/speed 520 N⋅m (384 ft⋅lbf) @ 6,100 rpm 680 N⋅m (502 ft⋅lbf) @ 1,500-5,650 rpm (2011–2014)
Fuel Consumption	City 15.8 L/100 km (17.9 mpg_{‑imp}; 14.9 mpg_{‑US}) - Highway 7.9 L/100 km (36 mpg_{‑imp}; 30 mpg_{‑US})
	Combined 12.9 L/100 km (21.9 mpg_{‑imp}; 18.2 mpg_{‑US})
Transmission	6-speed sports automatic gearbox (steering wheel paddle shifters)
Power Train	Rear wheel drive
Performance	Maximum speed: 311 km/h (193 mph)
	Acceleration: 0–100 km/h (62 mph): 3.9 sec.
Suspension	
	Front: Aluminum double wishbone suspension with coil springs, anti roll bar
	Rear: Aluminum double wishbone, trailing arm suspension with coil springs, anti roll bar
Weight	1,405 kg (3,097 lb)
Dimensions	Length: 4.22 m (166 in) / Width: 1.95 m (77 in) / Height: 1.18 m (46 in)
Price	€189,500+

== New models ==
=== Project Gecko ===
Project Gecko is an as-yet unreleased project, the first vehicle announced since the manufacturer's acquisition by Roheen Berry. The proposed drivetrain will use BMW's TwinPower, turbocharged eight-cylinder petrol engine and eight-speed gearbox, with a proposed top speed of over 320 km/h (200 mph) and a 0–100 km/h (62 mph) time of less than 3.5 seconds.

Production of Project Gecko was delayed in December 2021 in order for Wiesmann to focus on releasing Project Thunderball.

=== Project Thunderball ===
Revealed in April 2022, Project Thunderball is a fully electric two door luxury roadster, featuring Roding-supplied powertrain and batteries. The car makes 671 hp and 1100 Nm of torque. This allows for a 0º100 km/h time of 2.9 seconds, with a weight of 1,775 kg. The first production cars will be delivered to customers in 2024.

== See also ==
- Boldmen CR4
- List of German cars
