= Weisser =

Weisser is a surname of German origin. Notable people with the surname include:

- Morgan Weisser (born 1971), American actor
- Norbert Weisser (born 1946), German-born American actor
- Katja Schweizer (nee Weisser) (born 1978), German curler and coach
