= Wiese Islands =

Antarctic island group

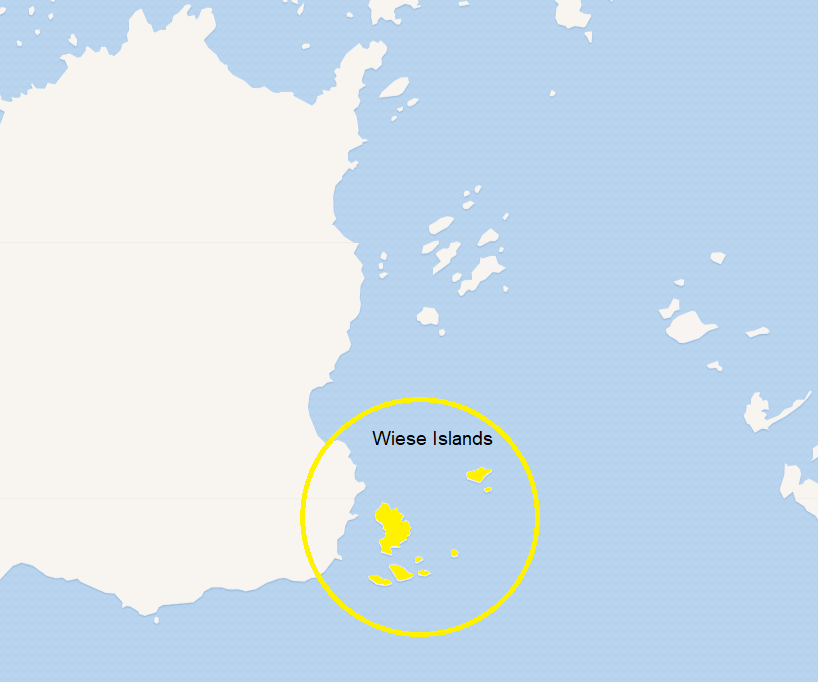
- Wiese Islands location off Renaud Island in the Biscoe Islands, Artarctica

- Location within Antarctic Peninsula Location within Antarctica

Geography
- Location: Antarctica
- Coordinates: 65°40′S 65°37′W

Administration
- Administered under the Antarctic Treaty System

Demographics
- Population: Uninhabited

Wiese Islands is a group of small islands lying 4.6 km (2.5 nmi) south of Karelin Islands, off the east side of Renaud Island in the Biscoe Islands. First accurately shown on an Argentine government chart of 1957. Named by the United Kingdom Antarctic Place-Names Committee (UK-APC) in 1959 for Vladimir Wiese, Soviet climatologist and oceanographer, a pioneer of ice forecasting methods and author of numerous works on sea ice in the Arctic.

== See also ==
- List of Antarctic and sub-Antarctic islands
