= Weiser =

Weiser may refer to:

== Places ==
- Weiser Airpark, a defunct aerodrome in Texas
- Weiser, Idaho
- Weiser State Forest
- Weiser Township, North Dakota
- Weiser River

== People ==
- Conrad Weiser (1696–1760), German pioneer
- Grethe Weiser (1903–1970), German actress
- Johann Conrad Weiser, Sr. (1662–1746), German Palatine
- Mark Weiser (1952–1999), chief scientist of Xerox PARC
- Malbim (1809–1879) (Meïr Löb ben Jehiel Michel Weiser), Russian rabbi
- Marty Weiser (1912–1988), American film publicist
- Mathias Weiser (born 1986), German politician
- Mitchell Weiser (born 1994), German footballer
- Peter M. Weiser (1781–c. 1825–1828), member of the Corps of Discovery
- Phil Weiser (born 1968), Attorney General of Colorado
- Ronald Weiser (born 1945), American diplomat
- Sarah Banet-Weiser (born 1966), American academic and author
- Alex Weiser, American Composer

== Others ==
- Weiser (film), a film directed by Wojciech Marczewski (2001)
- Red Wheel Weiser Conari, a publisher previously known as Weiser or Samuel Weiser, Inc from 1956 to 2000

== See also ==
- Weise, a surname
- Weisse, a surname
- Wieser, a surname
