= WAIS =

WAIS may refer to:

- West Antarctic Ice Sheet
- Wechsler Adult Intelligence Scale
- Wide Area Information Server (also, Wide area information service)
- WAIS (AM), a radio station (770 AM) licensed to Buchtel, Ohio, United States
- Westchester Academy for International Studies, a charter school in Houston, Texas, United States
- Western Australian Institute of Sport
- World Association of International Studies

== See also ==
- Wais (disambiguation)
