= Weisz =

Weisz is a Hungarian surname of German and Jewish origin. Notable people with the surname include:

- Árpád Weisz (1896–1944), Hungarian Olympic football player and manager
- Berthold Weisz (1845–?), Hungarian deputy
- Erik Weisz (1874–1926), Hungarian-born American magician best known by his stage name "Harry Houdini"
- Ezra Weisz (born 1971), American voice actor
- Ferenc Weisz (1885–1944), Hungarian footballer
- Franziska Weisz (born 1980), Austrian actress
- Paul B. Weisz (1919–2012), Czechoslovak-born American chemist
- Rachel Weisz (born 1970), English actress
- Richárd Weisz (1879–1945), Hungarian Olympic champion Greco-Roman wrestler
- Spencer Weisz (born 1995), American-Israeli basketball player
- Victor Weisz (1913–1966), German-born Hungarian-British political cartoonist
- Zoni Weisz (born 1937), Dutch Porajmos survivor
