= Zinoro 60H =

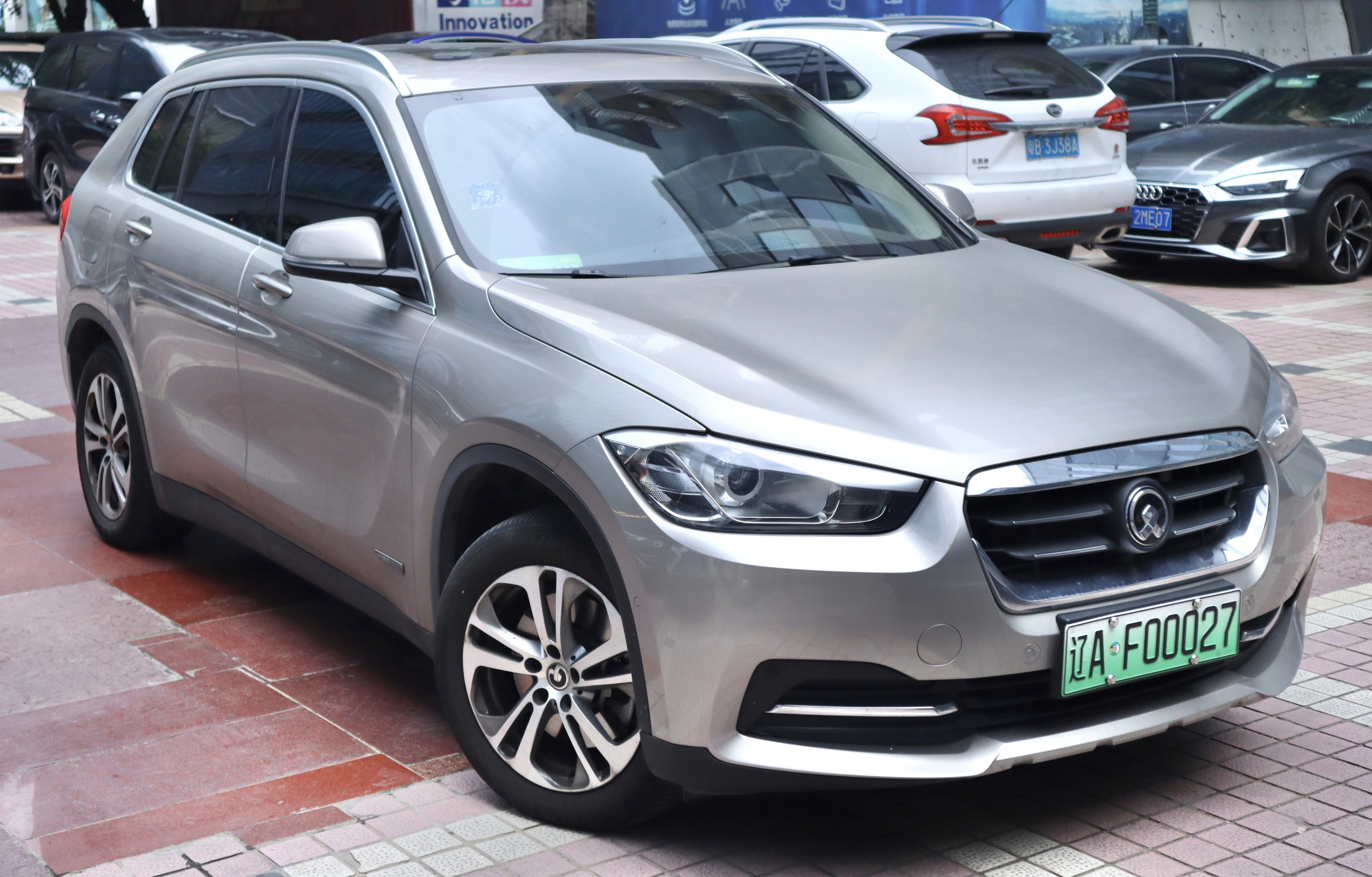

Overview
- Manufacturer: Zinoro
- Production: 2017–2020
- Designer: Sawyer Li (BMW Designworks)

Body and chassis
- Class: Subcompact luxury crossover SUV
- Layout: F4 layout
- Related: BMW X1

Powertrain
- Engine: petrol: 1.5 Liter BMW B38A15M0 (100 kW (134 hp)) + electric: 70 kW (94 hp)
- Electric motor: Permanent-magnet synchronous motor
- Transmission: 6-speed automatic
- Hybrid drivetrain: PHEV
- Battery: 7.7 kWh lithium-ion high-voltage

Dimensions
- Wheelbase: 2,780 mm (109.4 in)
- Length: 4,582 mm (180.4 in)
- Width: 1,820 mm (71.7 in)
- Height: 1,609 mm (63.3 in)

The Zinoro 60H is a plug-in hybrid compact crossover SUV produced by BMW Brilliance under the Chinese automobile brand Zinoro. It launched in the Chinese market in March 2017.

== Overview ==
At the Auto Shanghai in April 2015, Zinoro presented for the first time with the 'Concept Next', a preview of the successor to the first-generation BMW X1 electric-powered Zinoro 1E.

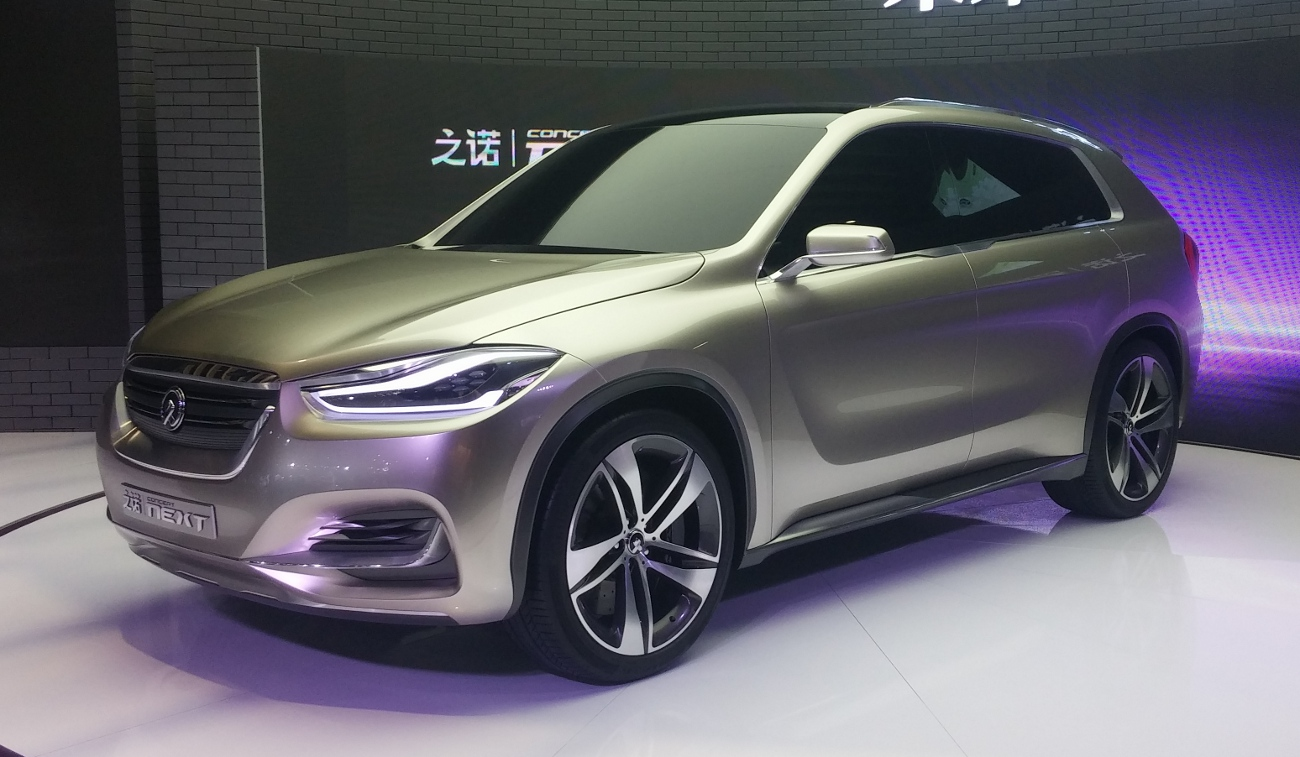
Zinoro Concept Next

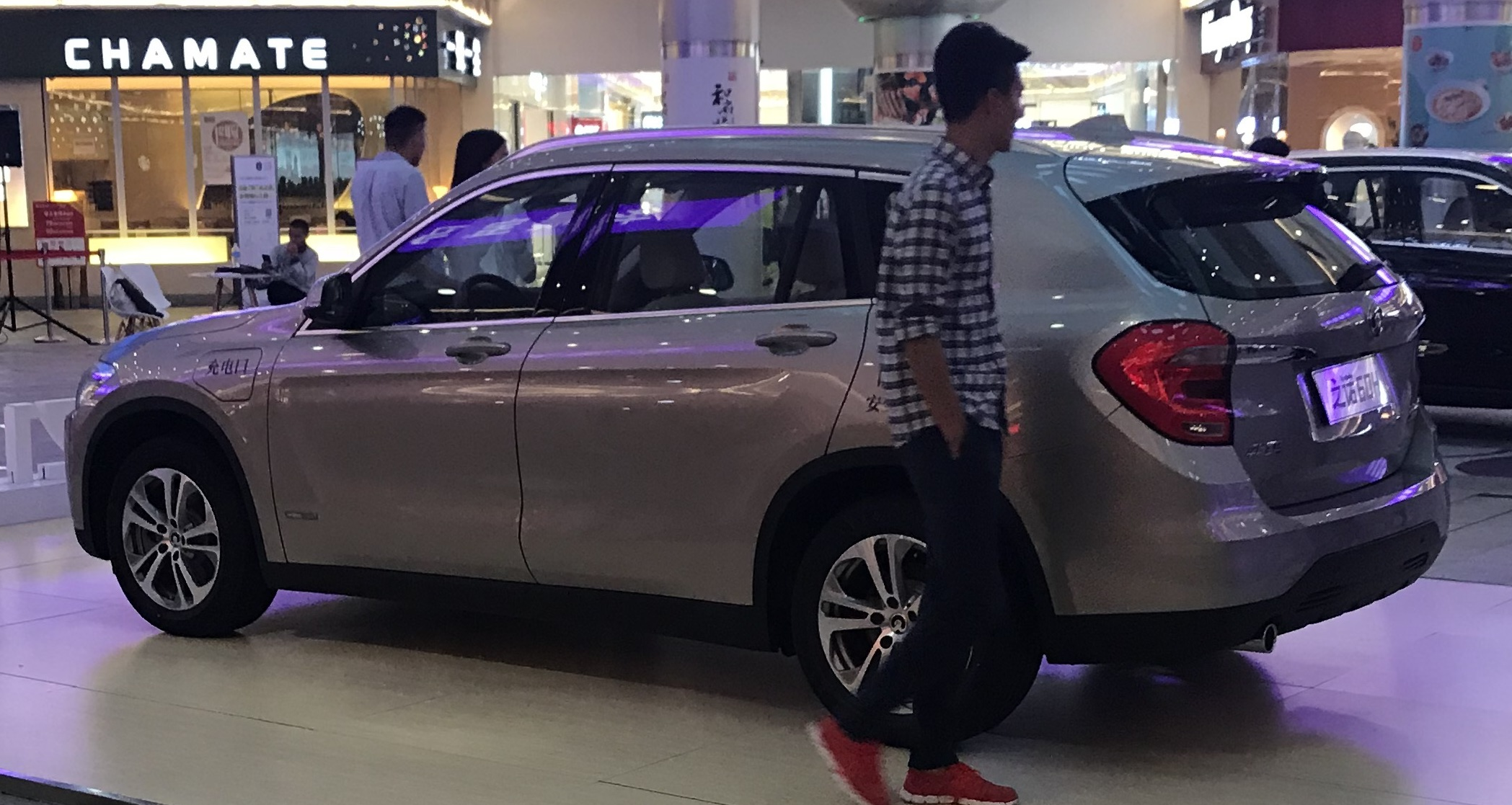
Rear quarter view

The production vehicle was presented in August 2016. The 60H is based on the second-generation exclusive version of the BMW X1 and is powered by the BMW 2 Series Active Tourer Plug-in hybrid. In the Chinese market, the SUV was launched on 23 March 2017.

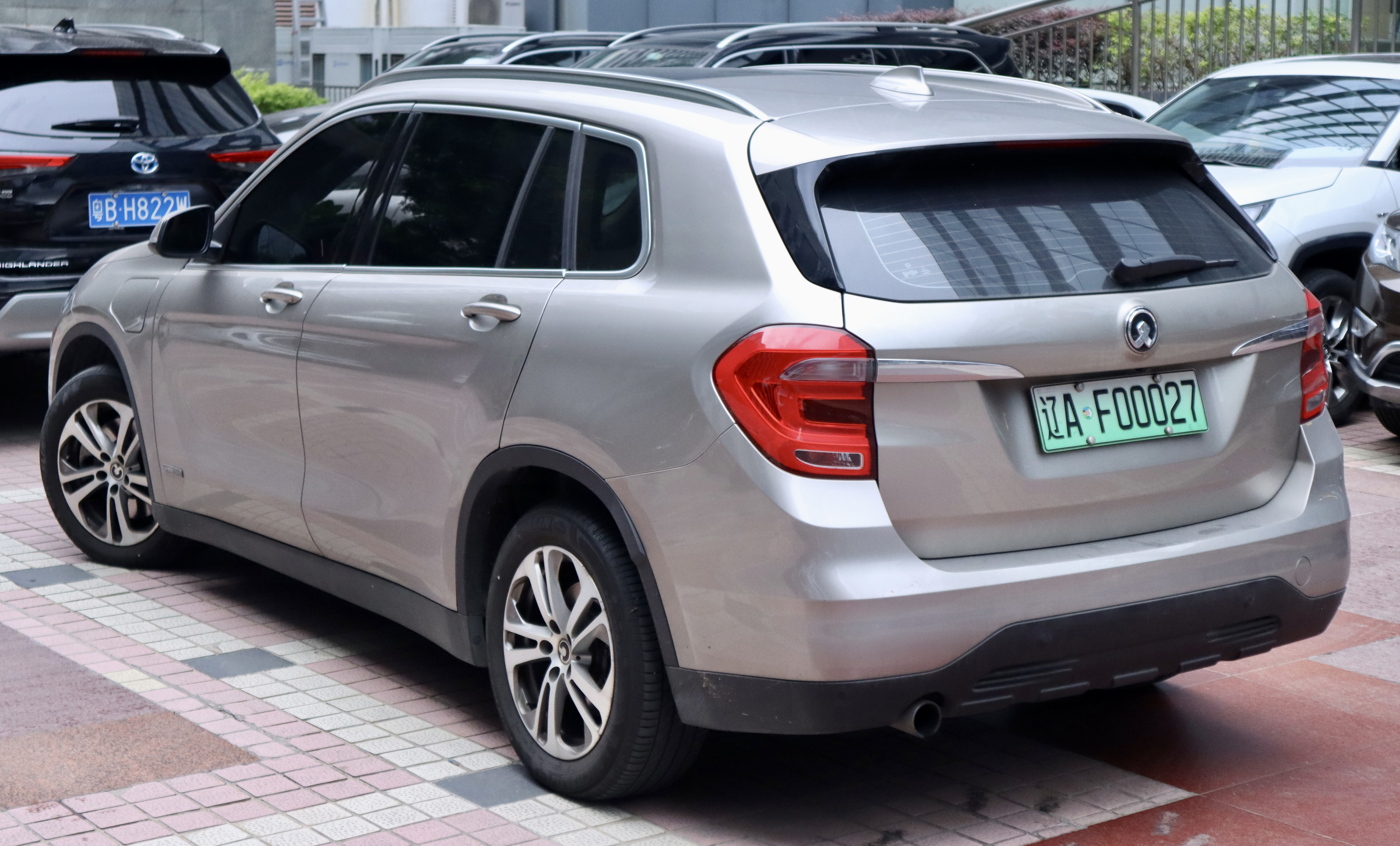
Zinoro 60H (rear) in Shenzhen

=== Powertrain ===
The plug-in hybrid drivetrain of the Zinoro 60H consists of a 136hp 1.5 liter turbo engine and a 15hp electric motor, good for a combined output of 151hp. Zinoro claims a 0-100 acceleration time of 7.6 seconds, a fuel consumption of 1.8 liters per 100 kilometers and a pure electric range of 60 kilometers. As for the naming, 60 stands for range and H stands for hybrid.
