= Zinoro =

Luxury automobile marque owned by BMW Brilliance

Zinoro 之诺
- Product type: Automotive marque
- Current owner: BMW Brilliance
- Country: China
- Introduced: 2013; 13 years ago
- Discontinued: 2020
- Website: http://www.zhinuo.com.cn/
- Industry: Automotive
- Headquarters: Liaoning, China

Zinoro (之诺) was a luxury automobile marque owned by BMW Brilliance which specialises in electric vehicles. It was launched in 2013.

== History ==
In 2013, BMW and Brilliance decided to create a new electric car brand for the domestic Chinese market called Zinoro. The first vehicle of the branch to join the offer was the compact crossover Zinoro 1E developed as a twin version of the BMW X1, differing from it to a moderate extent visually, and above all - instead of an internal combustion engine, a purely electric drive.

Two years later, during the 2015 Shanghai Auto Show, Zinoro presented the Concept Next prototype, which was a study announcement of the successor of the 1E model, and the vehicle debuted in production form in June 2016. Unlike its predecessor, the Zinoro 60H is a combustion-electric car of the plug-in hybrid type. Like its predecessor, the car is a twin model of the next incarnation BMW X1. Zinoro cars were offered in parallel with the BMW sister products exclusively on the Chinese market.

== Products ==
=== Zinoro 1E ===
Zinoro 1E (之诺1E) is all-electric crossover, based on the BMW X1 (E84), was the first product of BMW Brilliance's new brand and the first new energy vehicle (NEV) from a Chinese premium manufacturer. It was unveiled at the 2013 Guangzhou Auto Show.

The Zinoro 1E had a rear-mounted 125 kW electric motor and produced a peak torque of 250 N·m (184 lb-ft). The motor is powered by a lithium iron phosphate battery pack that can deliver an all-electric range of up to 150 km (93 mi). Charging of the battery takes around 7.5 hours with a 16A wallbox. Top speed is electronically limited to 130 km/h (81 mph).

After early 2014 the Zinoro 1E was available for leasing only in Beijing and Shanghai, and the company planned to open another showroom in Shenyang. Leasing starts at 400 RMB per day (~US$65) or 7,400 RMB per month (~US$1,200). The annual contract was planned to include the wall box charger, car registration plate, insurance, maintenance, and repairs. The Zinoro 1E is eligible for a NEV plate in Beijing, which had a registration quota of 20,000 new energy vehicles for 2014. In Shanghai license plates are auctioned for the equivalent of just under €10,000 as of September 2014. As of 2014, electric cars received their license plate free of charge.

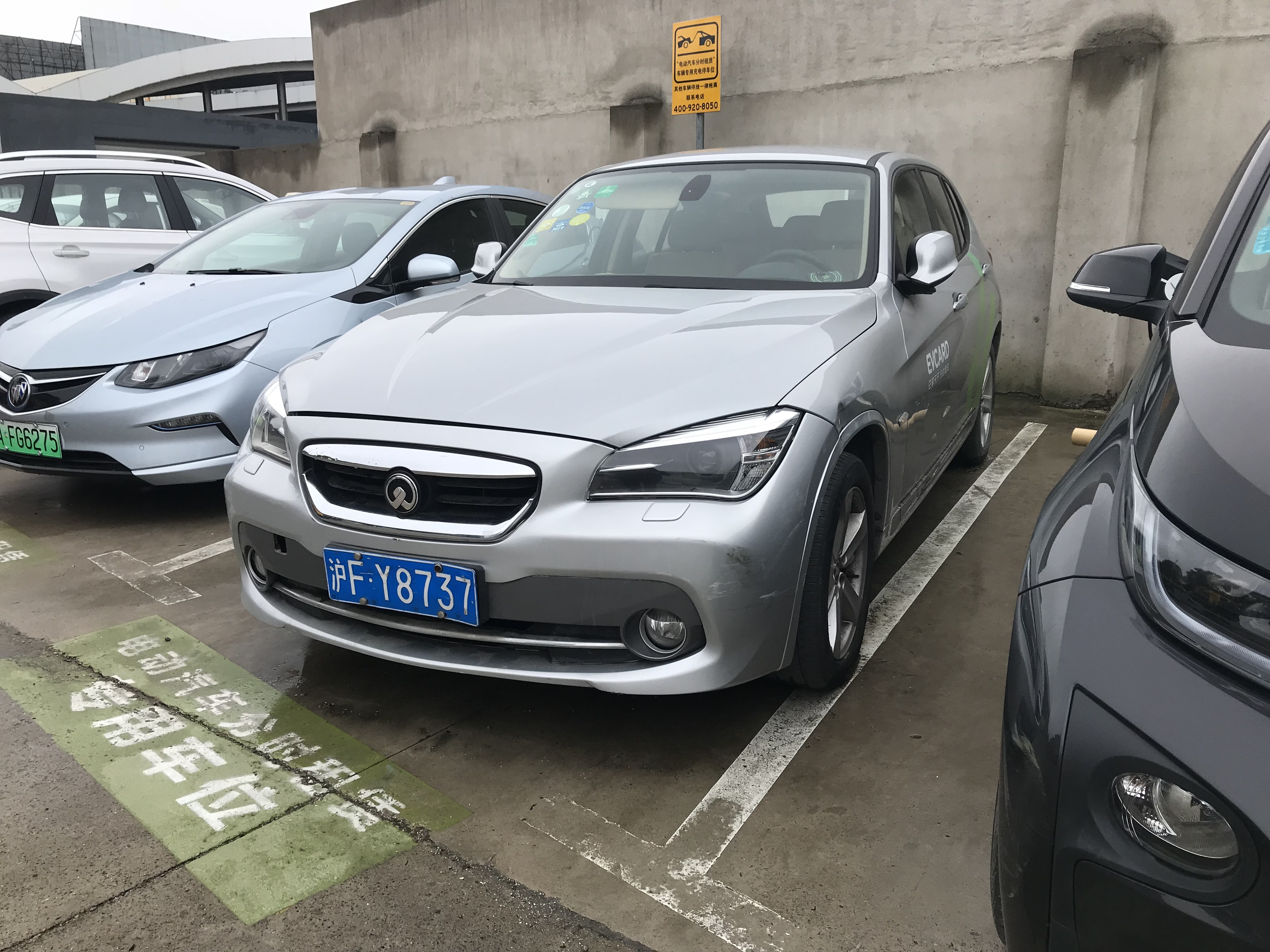
Zinoro 1E front

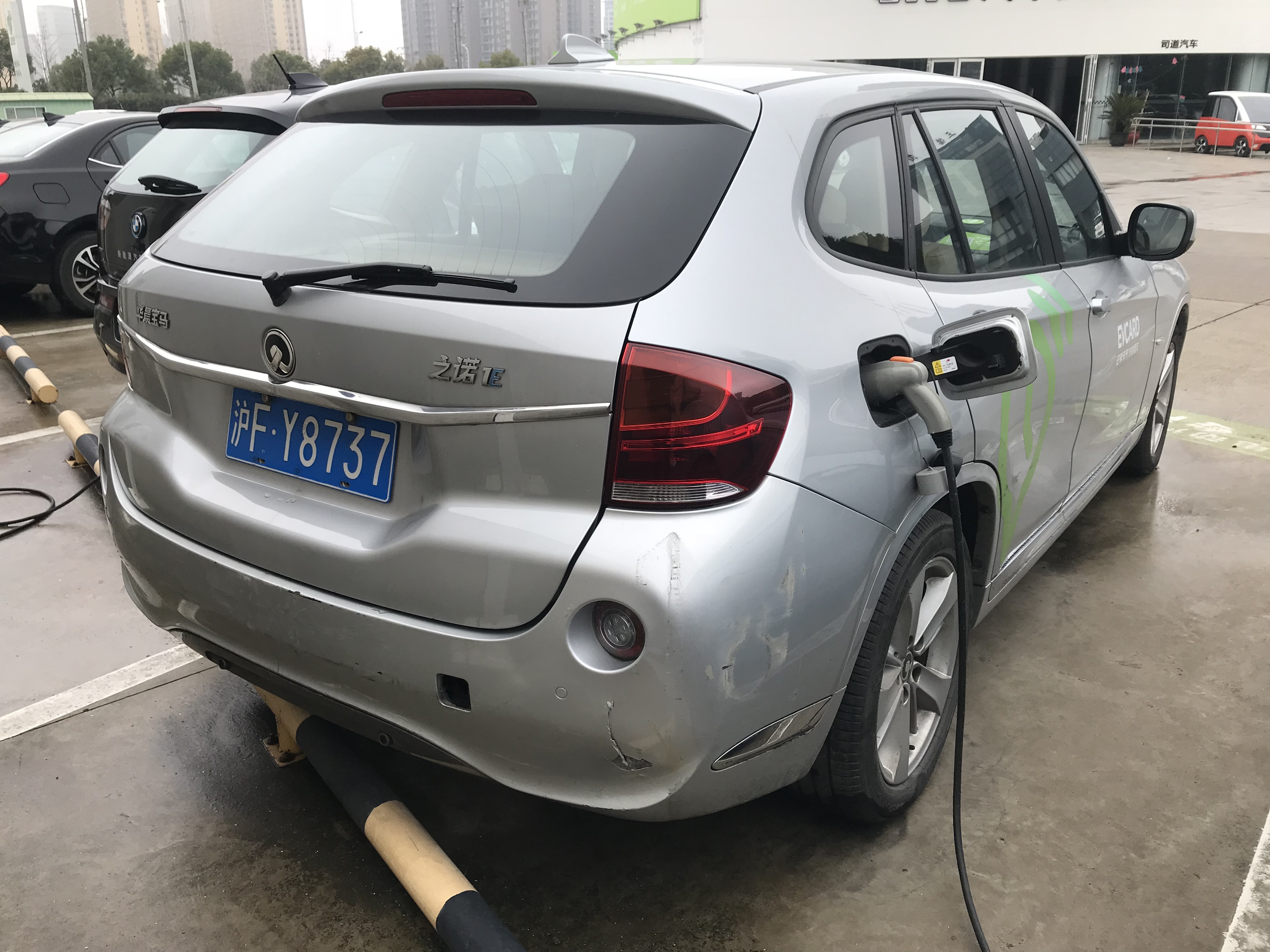
Zinoro 1E rear

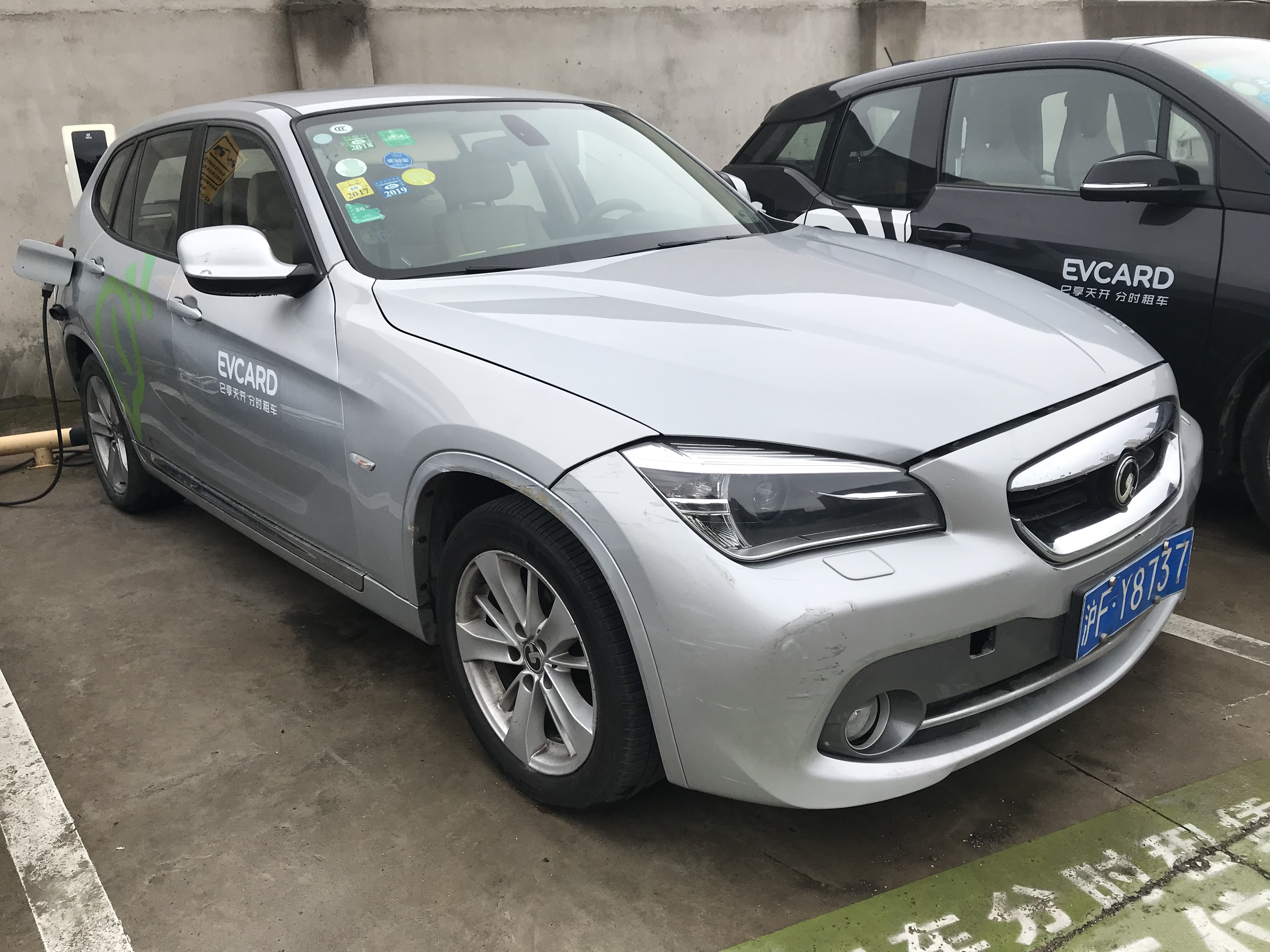
Zinoro 1E charging

=== Zinoro 60H ===
Zinoro 60H (之诺60H) is a plug-in hybrid electric vehicle based on the second generation BMW X1 Long Wheelbase and previewed by the Zinoro Concept Next, launched in 2016.

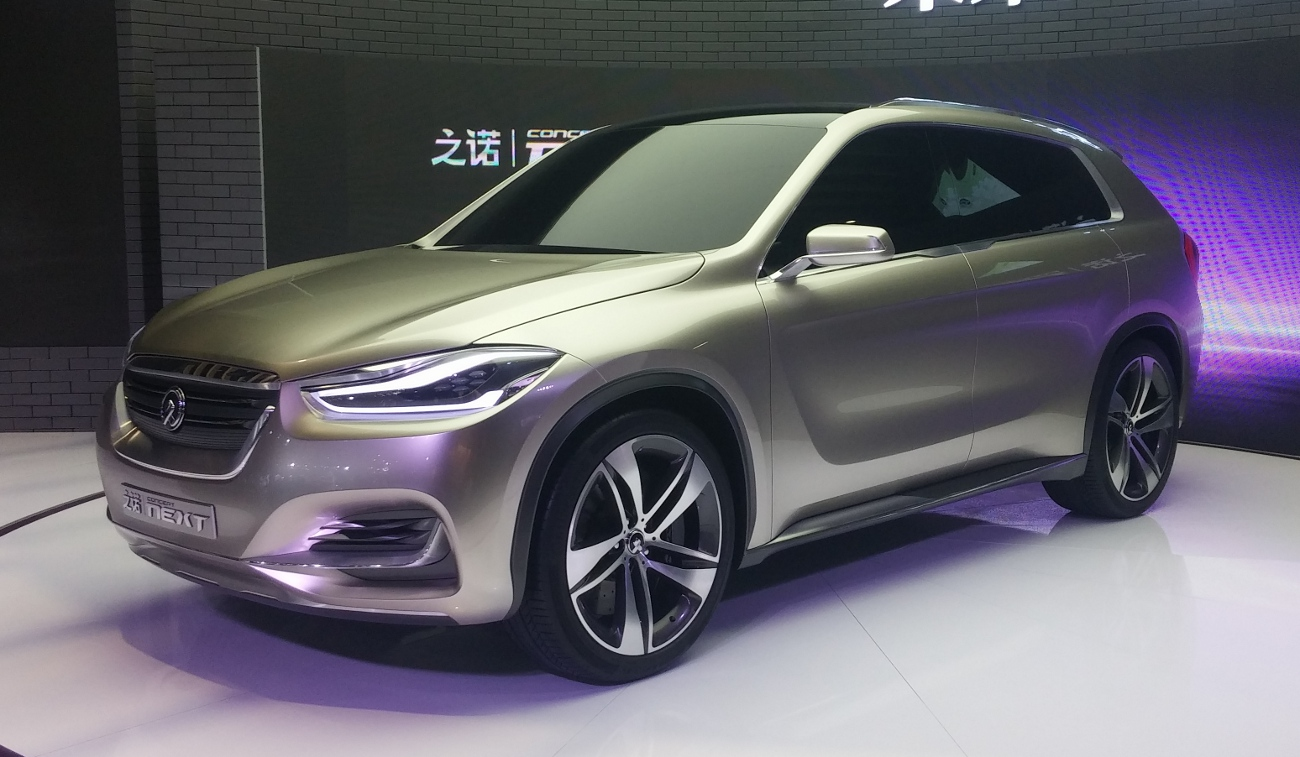
Zinoro Concept Next front

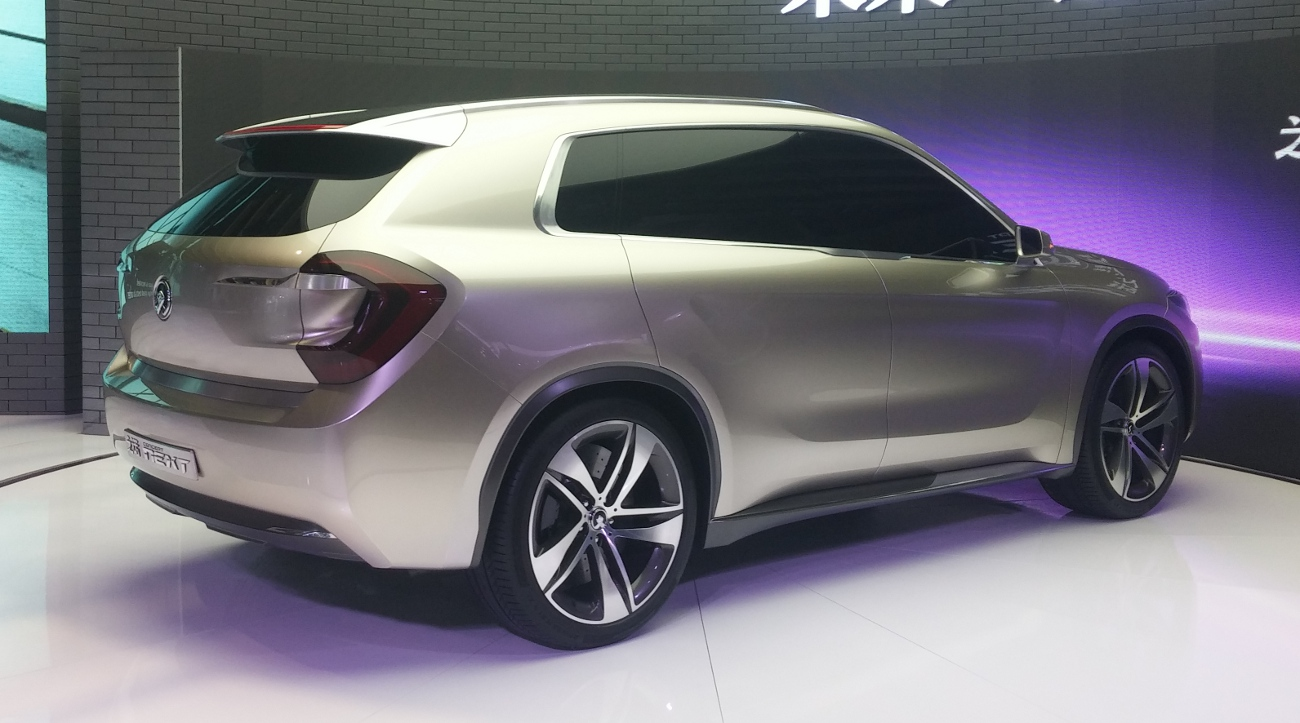
Zinoro Concept Next rear

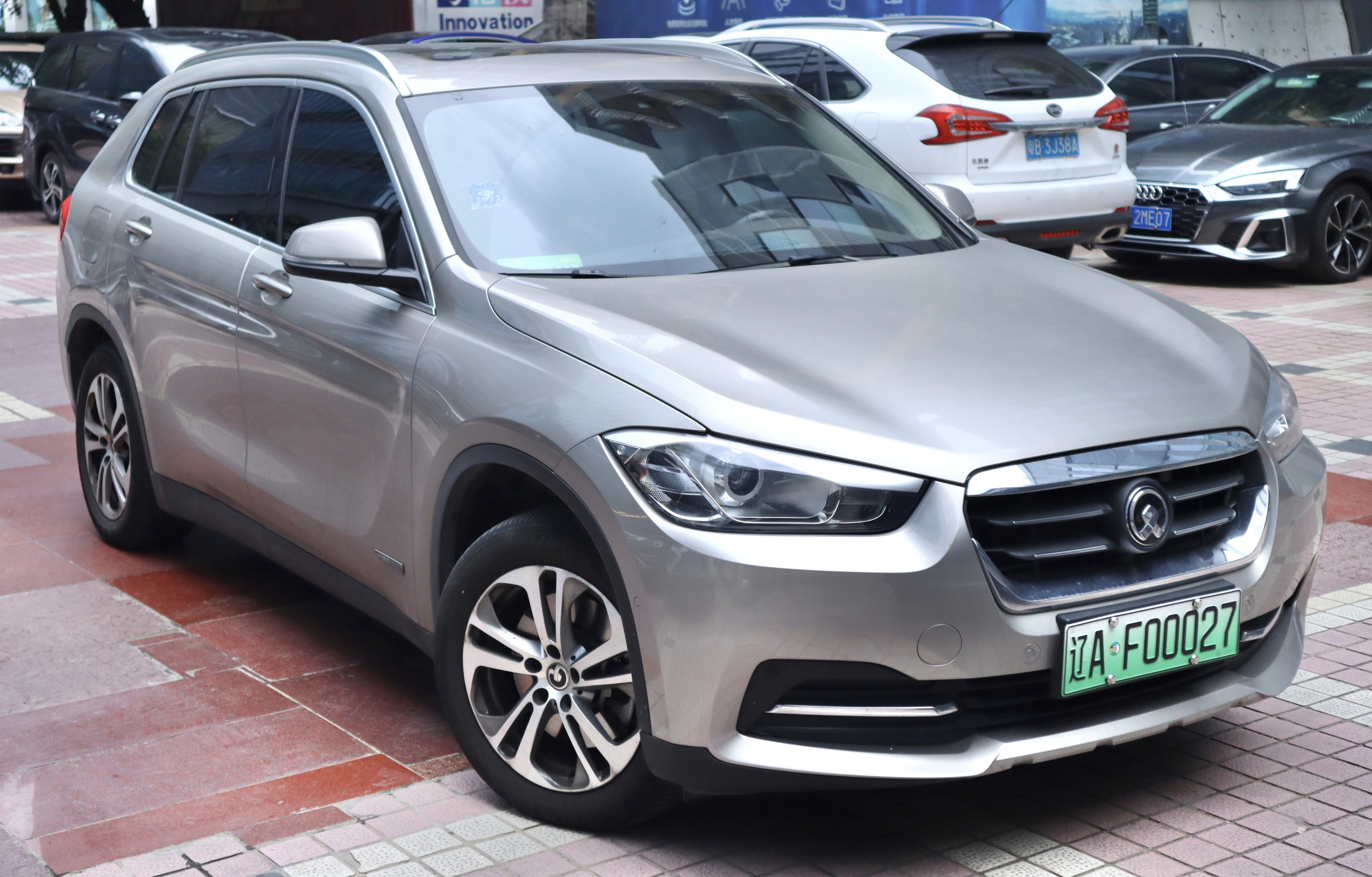
Zinoro 60H

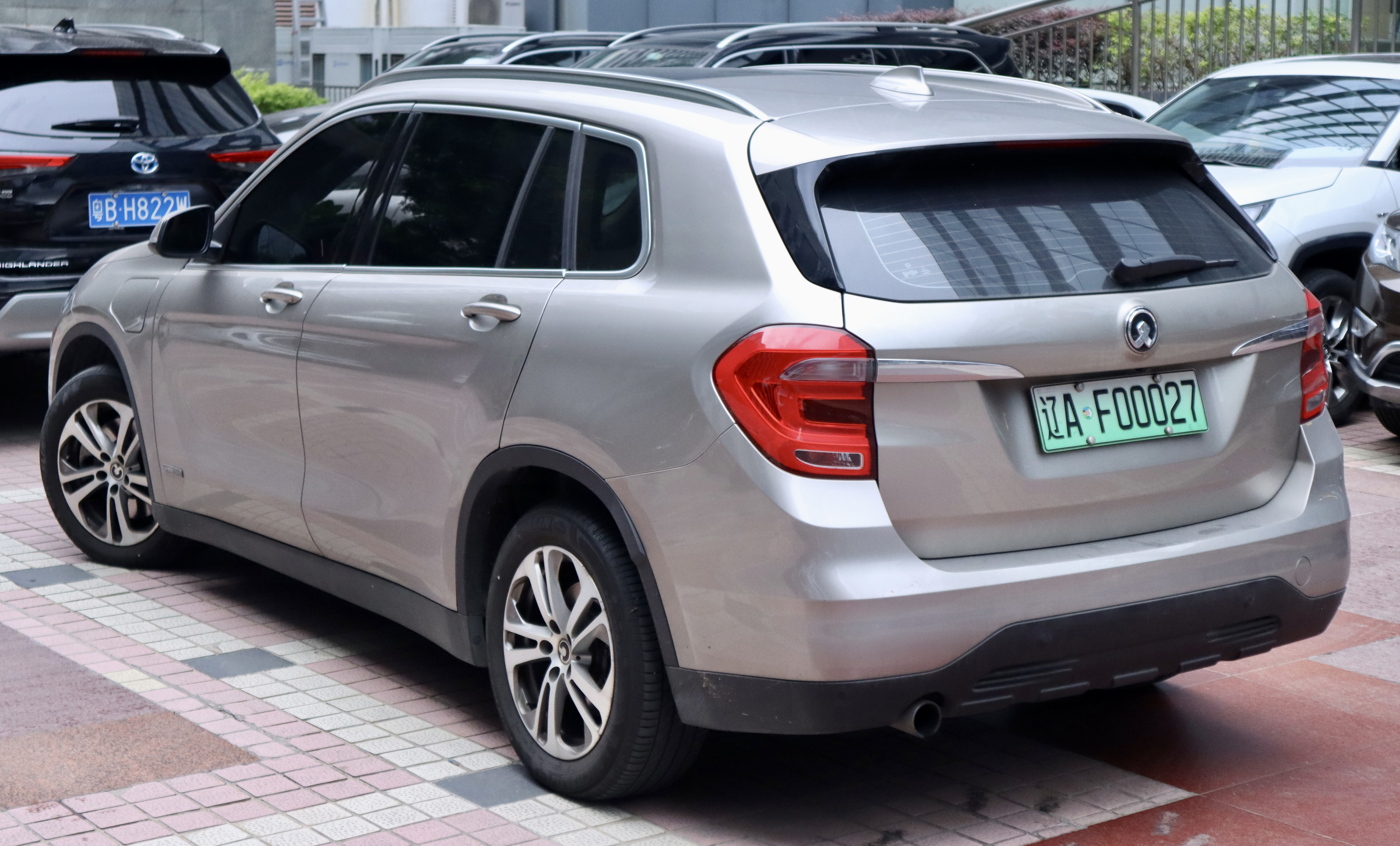
Zinoro 60H (rear view)
