= BMW Brilliance =

Automobile manufacturing company headquartered in Shenyang, China

BMW Brilliance Automotive Ltd.
- Type: Joint venture
- Industry: Automotive
- Founded: 27 March 2003; 23 years ago
- Headquarters: Shenyang, Liaoning, China
- Area served: China
- Key people: Franz Decker (Chief Executive Officer and President); Walter Mertl (Chairman)
- Products: Automobiles
- Owners: BMW (75%); Brilliance Auto (25%)
- Number of employees: ~25.000
- Divisions: Zinoro

Chinese name
- Simplified Chinese: 华晨宝马汽车有限公司
- Traditional Chinese: 華晨寶馬汽車有限公司
Transcriptions
Standard Mandarin
- Hanyu Pinyin: Huáchén Bǎomǎ Qìchē Yǒuxiàn Gōngsī
- Website: www.bmw-brilliance.cn

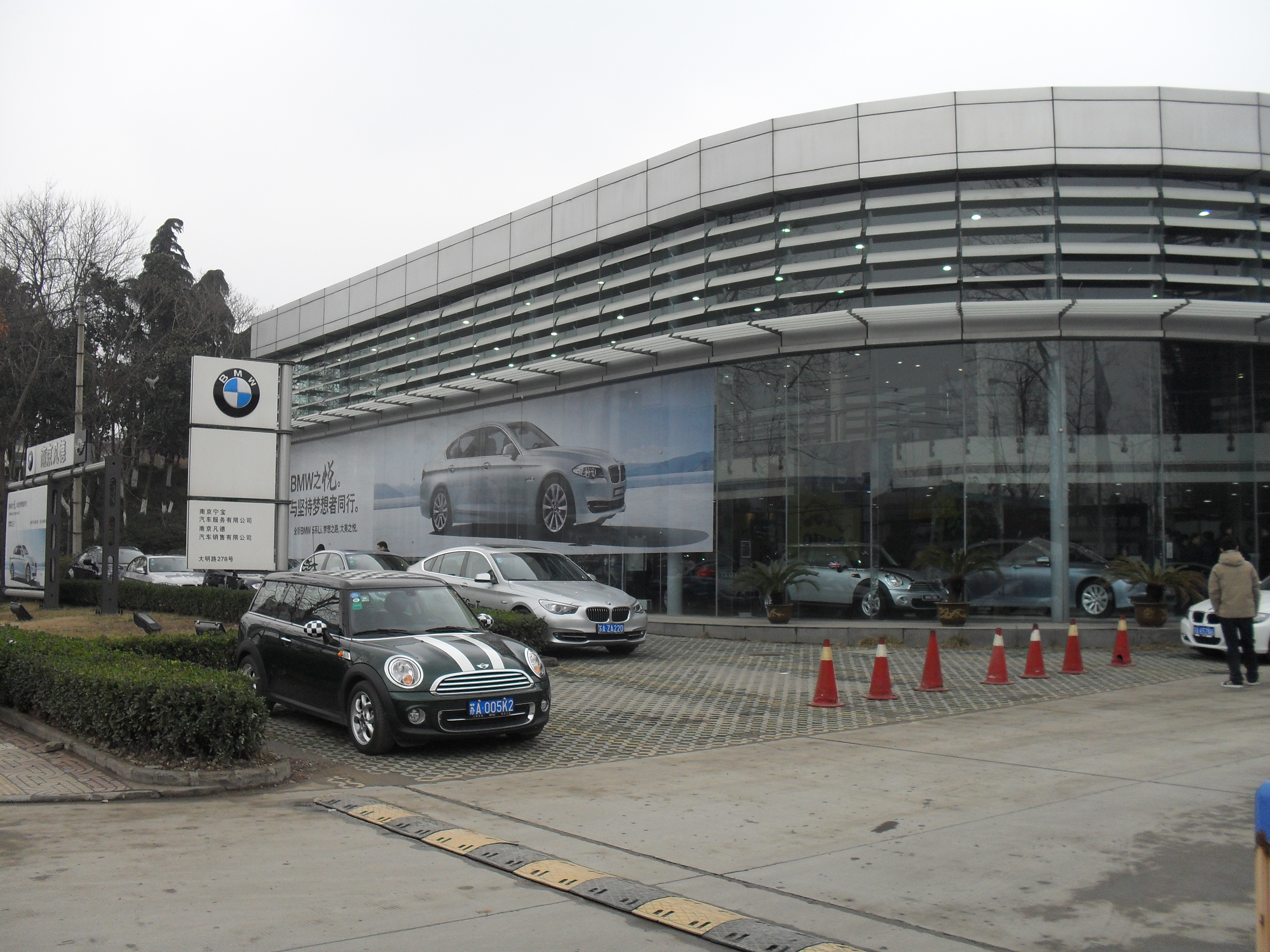
BMW Brilliance dealer in Nanjing, China

BMW Brilliance (officially BMW Brilliance Automotive Ltd.) is an automobile manufacturing company headquartered in Shenyang, China, and a joint venture between BMW (as majority holder) and Brilliance Auto. Its principal activity is the production, distribution, and sale of BMW passenger cars in mainland China.

The BMW Brilliance Zinoro all-electric crossover, based on the BMW X1 (E84), is the first product of BMW Brilliance's brand and the first new energy vehicle (NEV) from a Chinese premium manufacturer. Since early 2014, the Zinoro 1E is available for leasing only in Beijing and Shanghai.

== History ==
On August 23, 2020, the steel structure of BMW's largest paint shop in the world was completed, and the new BMW factory in Tiexi was completed.

On 27 March 2003 BMW and Brilliance Auto agreed to form a joint venture to produce BMW cars for the Chinese market, with BMW holding a 50 per cent stake, Brilliance Auto 40.5 per cent and the Shenyang municipal government 9.5 per cent. BMW and Brilliance agreed to invest an initial €450 million (US$483 million) in the venture. The first Chinese-made BMW, a BMW 325, was sold in October 2003.

In April 2009 BMW Brilliance announced that it would construct a second automobile assembly plant in China. Construction of the plant began in Shenyang in June 2010, with a planned cost of US$73.53 million and a production capacity of 100,000 units. Production at the plant began in May 2012.

In January 2011 BMW Brilliance announced that it would begin Chinese production of a BMW 5 series electric hybrid car later that year.

In 2013, BMW Brilliance opened a research and development centre. It was expanded in 2020, making it BMW's largest R&D centre outside of Germany.

In October 2018, BMW announced that it would increase its stake from 50% to 75%, making BMW the first foreign carmaker to take majority control of its joint venture in China.

In February 2022, BMW acquired a majority 75% stake in BMW Brilliance with Brilliance indirectly owning the remaining 25% of the company.

== Products ==
BMW Brilliance currently produces the following vehicles:

- BMW 2 Series Gran Coupé (F78)
- BMW 3 Series (G20) (1.6 litre, 2.0 litre and 3.0 litre)
- BMW i3 (NA8)
- BMW 5 Series (G68) (i5, 2.0 litre and 3.0 litre)
- BMW X1 (U12)
- BMW X3 (G48)
- BMW iX3 (NA5)
- BMW X5 (G18)

== Former products ==
- BMW X1 (E84) (2.0 litre）(2012-2015)
- BMW X1 (F49) (1.5 litre, 2.0 litre and Hybrid version) (2015–2022)
- BMW X2 (F39) (2017–2023)
- BMW X3 (G01/G08) (2.0 litre and iX3) (2017–2024)
- BMW 1 Series (F52) (1.5 litre and 2.0 litre) (2017–2023)
- BMW 2 Series Active Tourer (F45) (1.5 litre and 2.0 litre）(2014–2021)
- BMW 3 Series (E46) (2.0 litre and 2.5 litre) (2004)
- BMW 3 Series (E90) (2.0 litre and 2.5 litre) (2005–2012)
- BMW 3 Series (F30/F35) (1.6 litre 2.0 litre and 3.0 litre) (2013–2019)
- BMW 5 Series (E60) (2.2 litre to 3.0 litre) (2004–2010)
- BMW 5 Series (F18) (2.0 litre and 3.0 litre) (2011–2017)
- BMW 5 Series (G38) (2.0 litre, 3.0 litre and Hybrid version) (2017–2023)

== Gallery ==
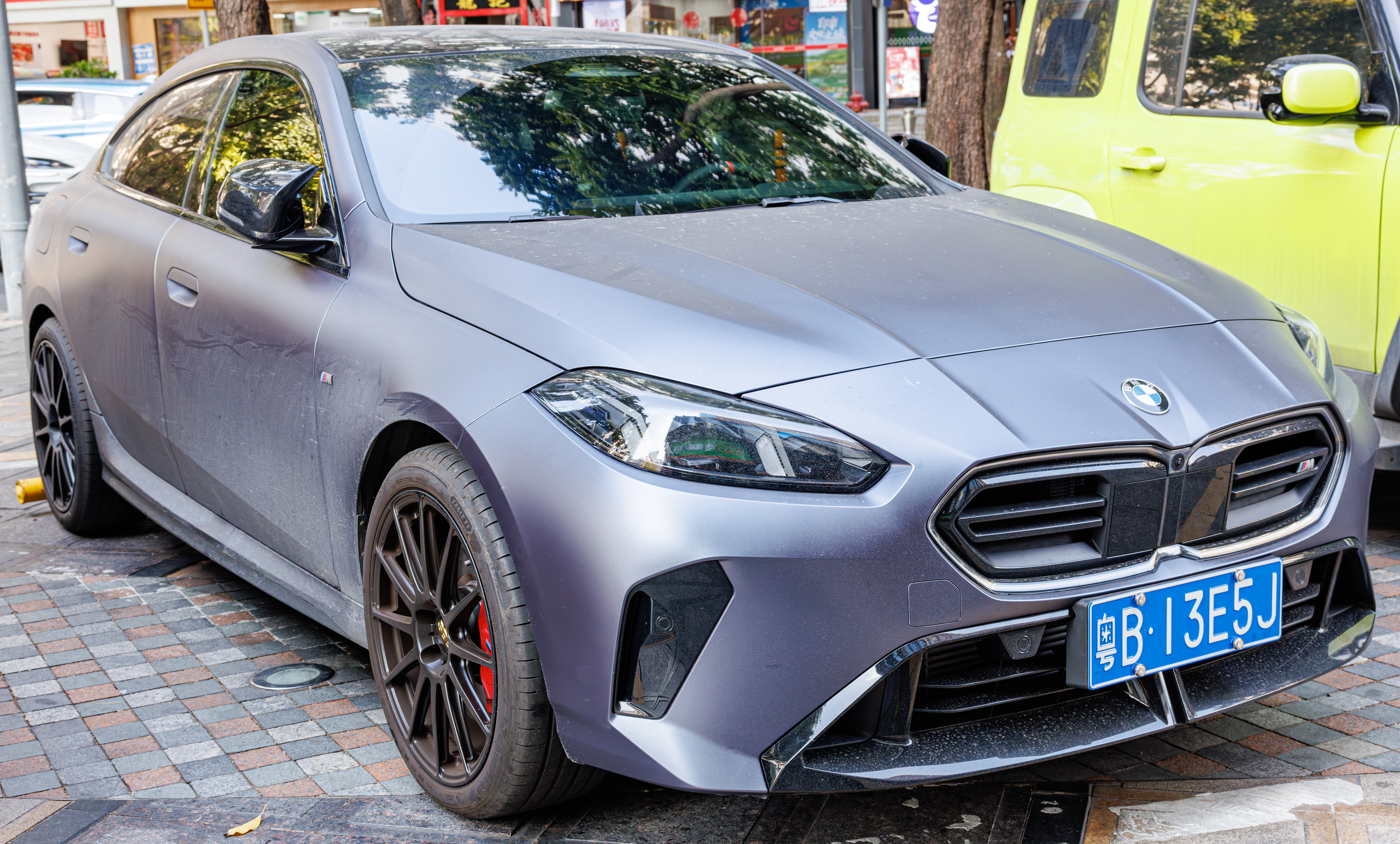
BMW Brilliance 2-Series Gran Coupe F78

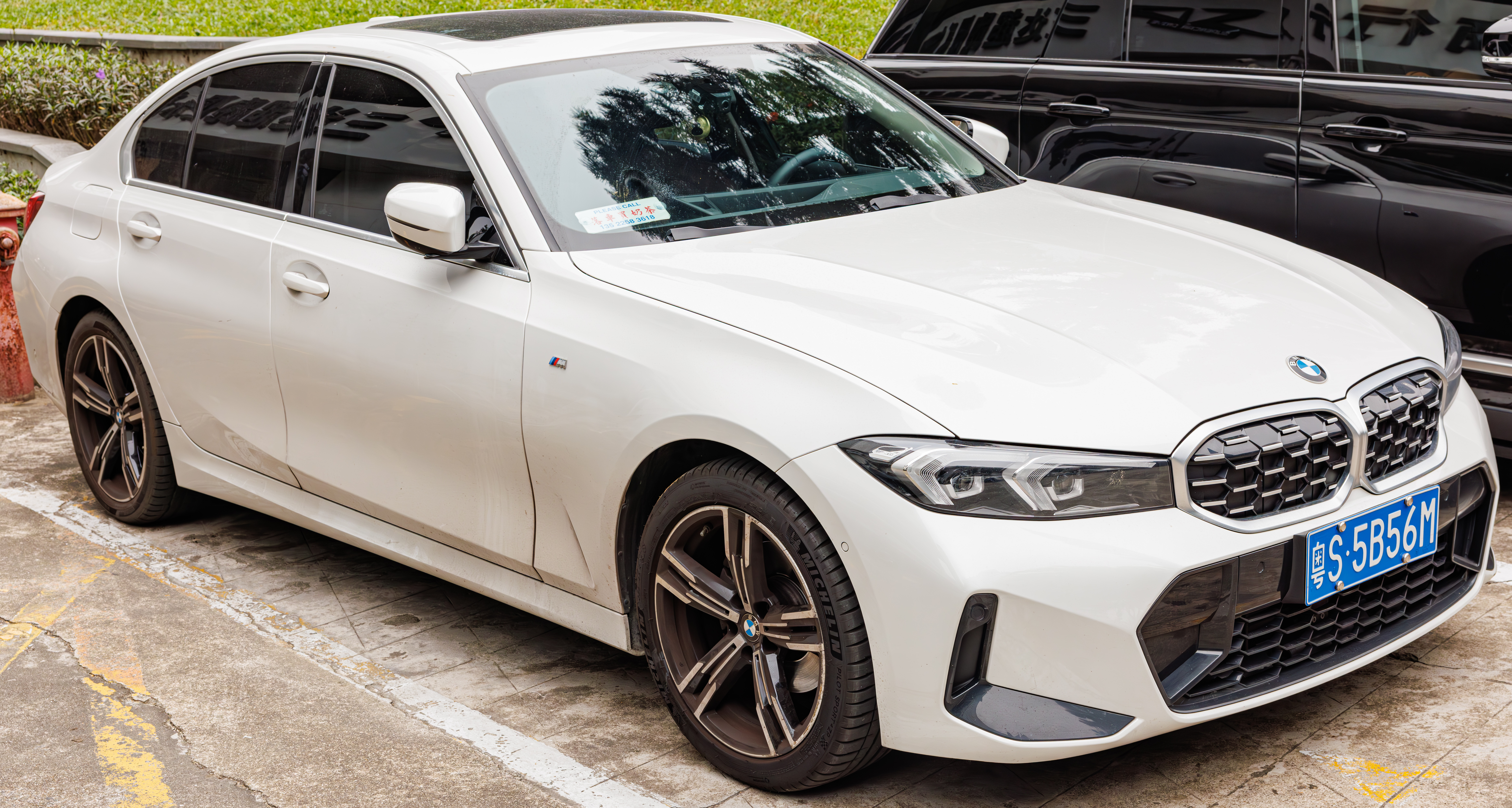
BMW Brilliance 3-Series G20

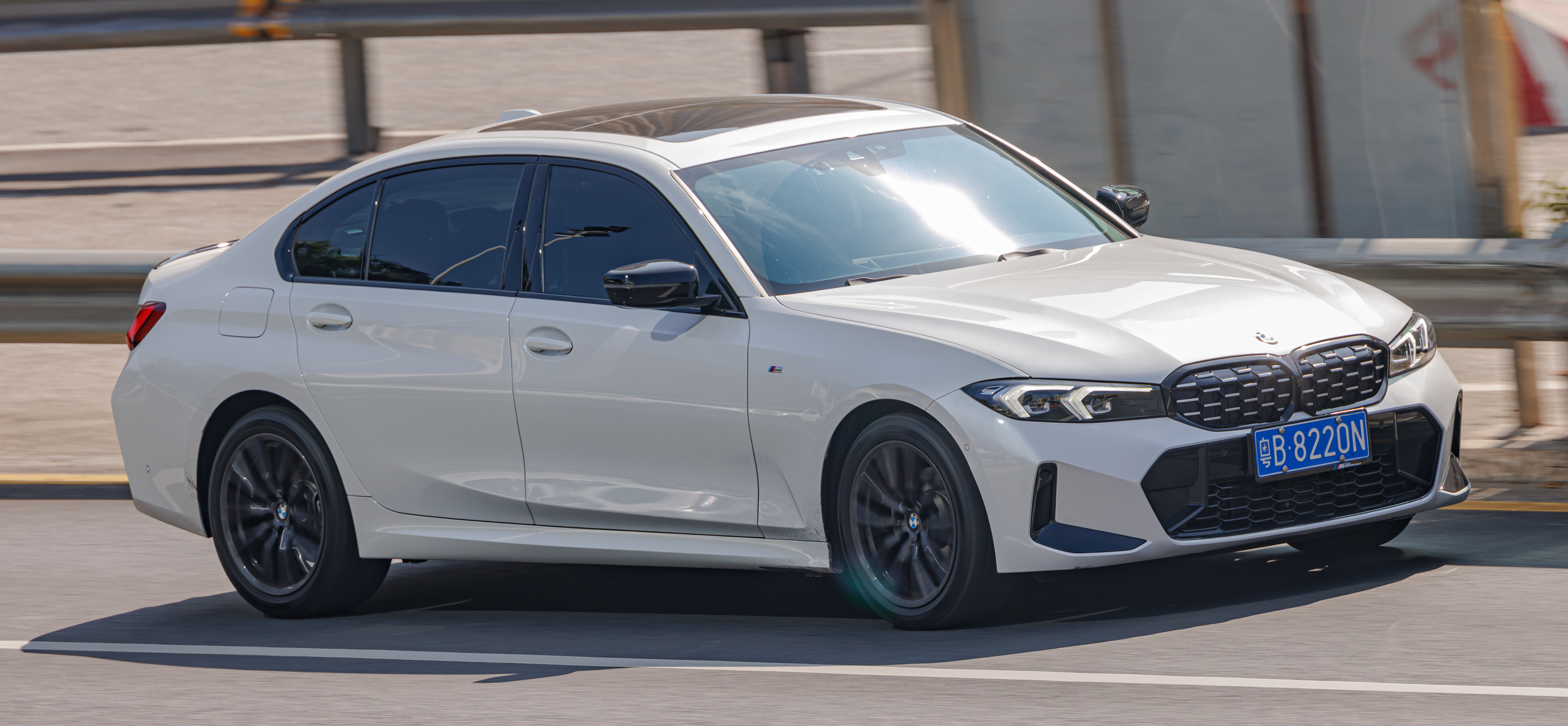
BMW Brilliance 3-Series G28

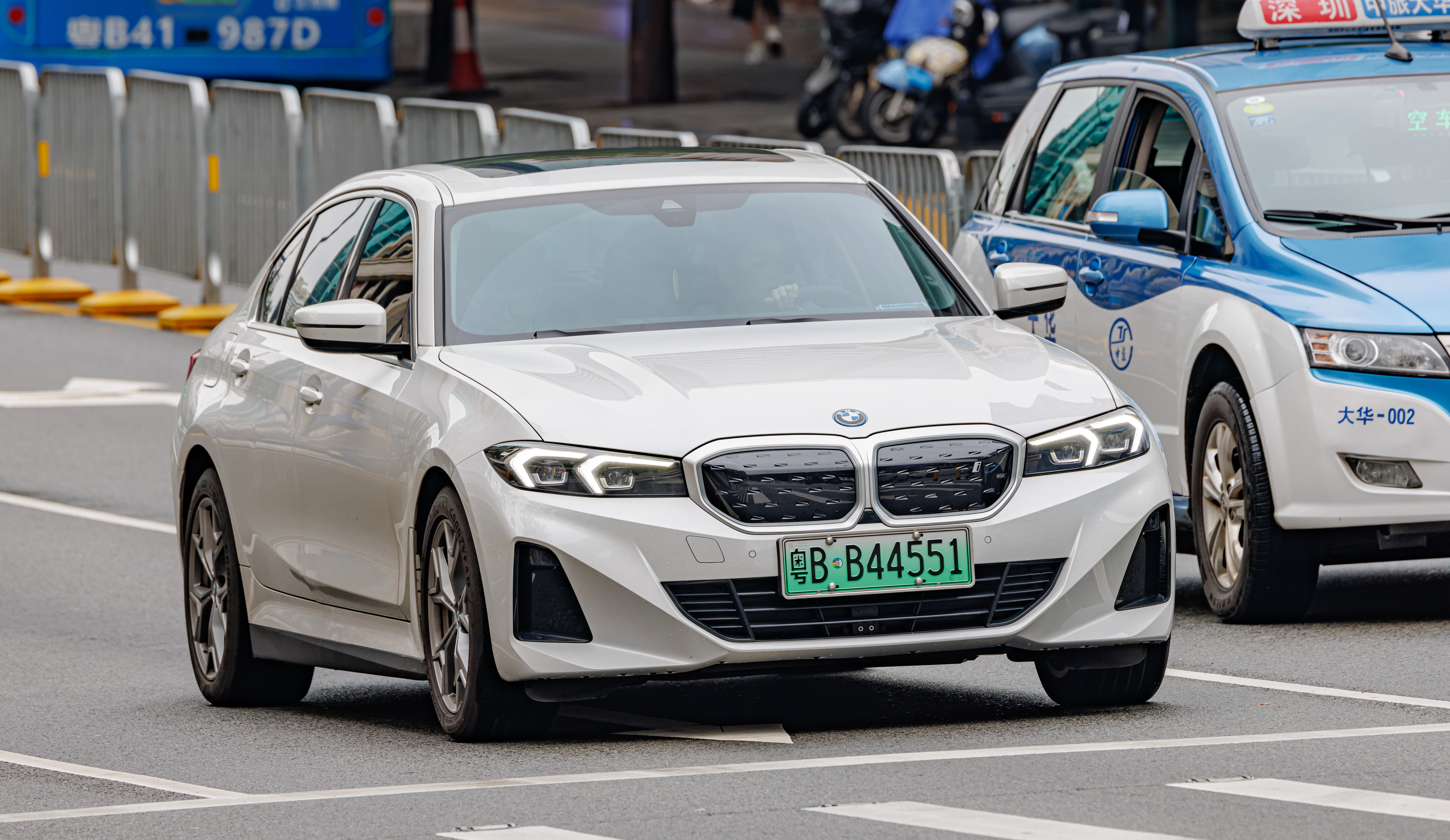
BMW Brilliance i3 G28 BEV

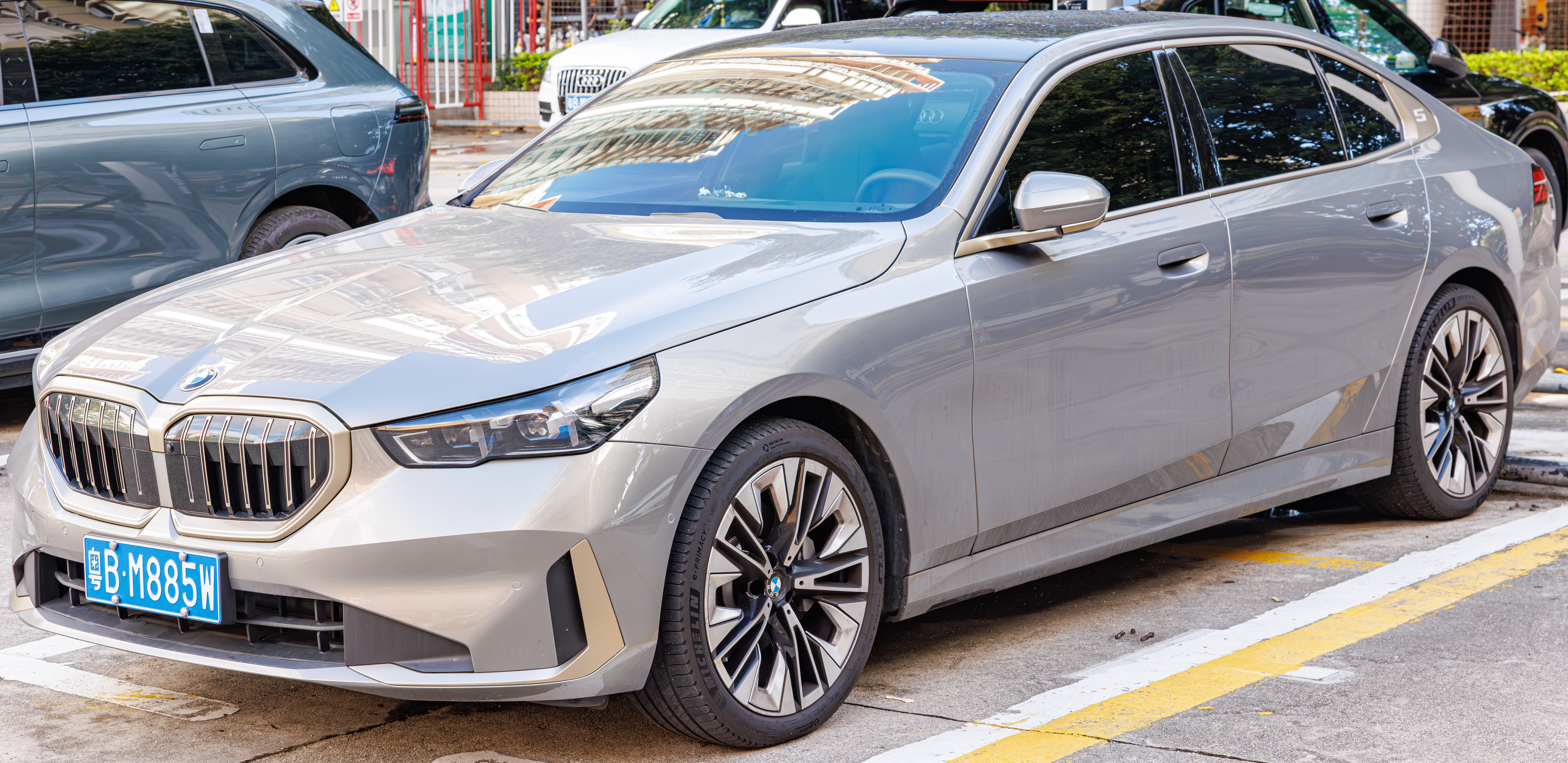
BMW Brilliance 5-Series G68 Li

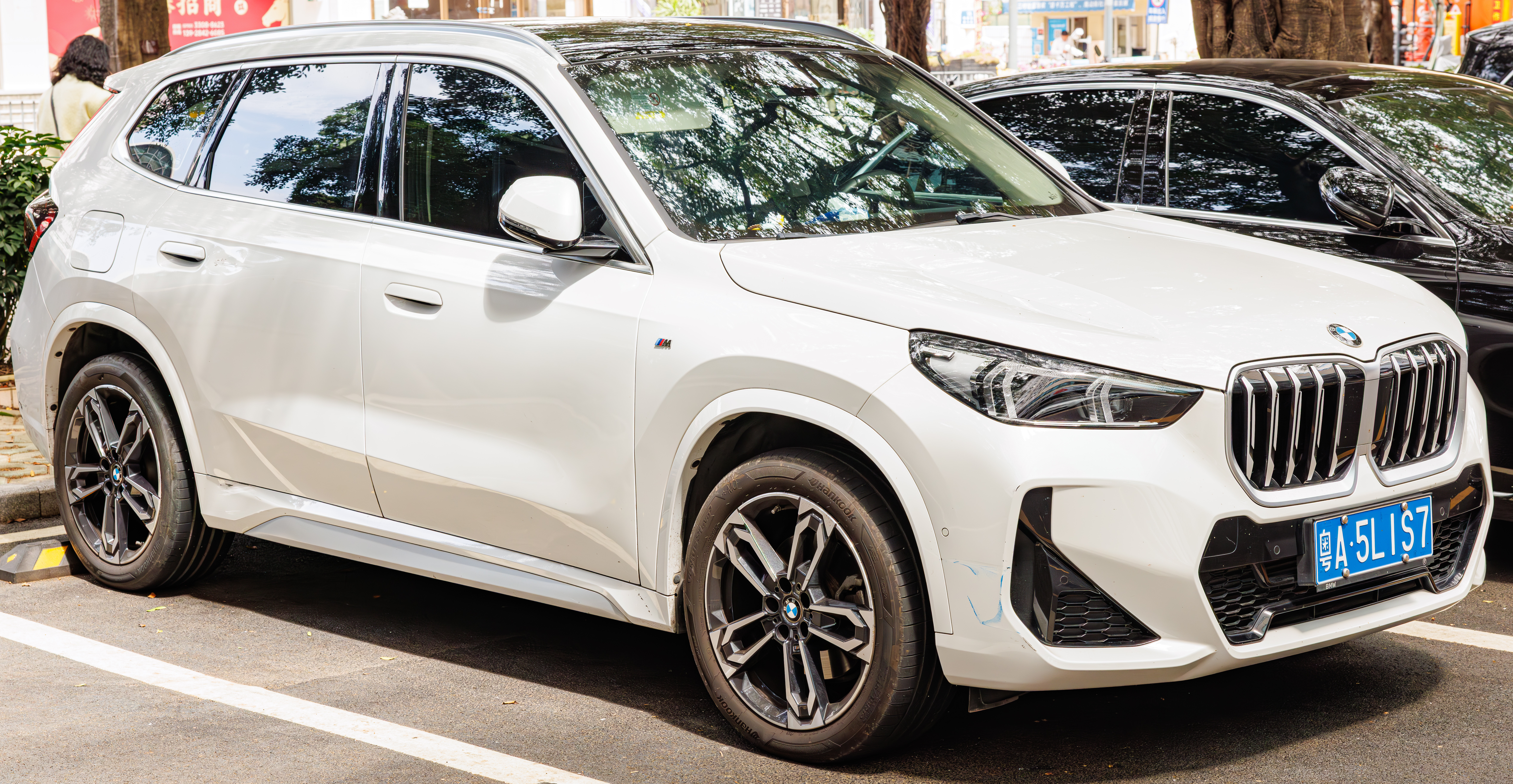
BMW Brilliance X1-Series U12

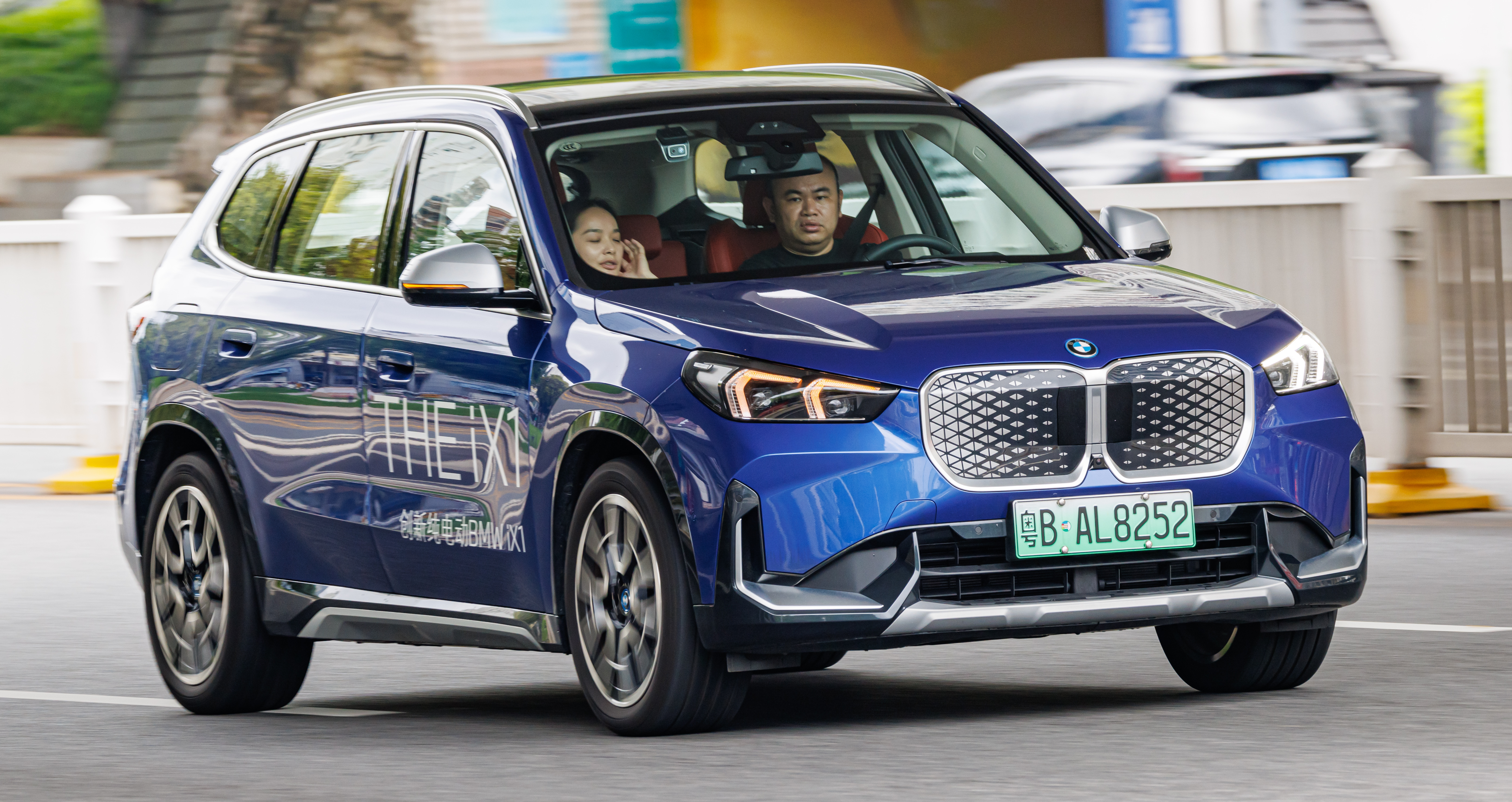
BMW Brilliance iX1 U12

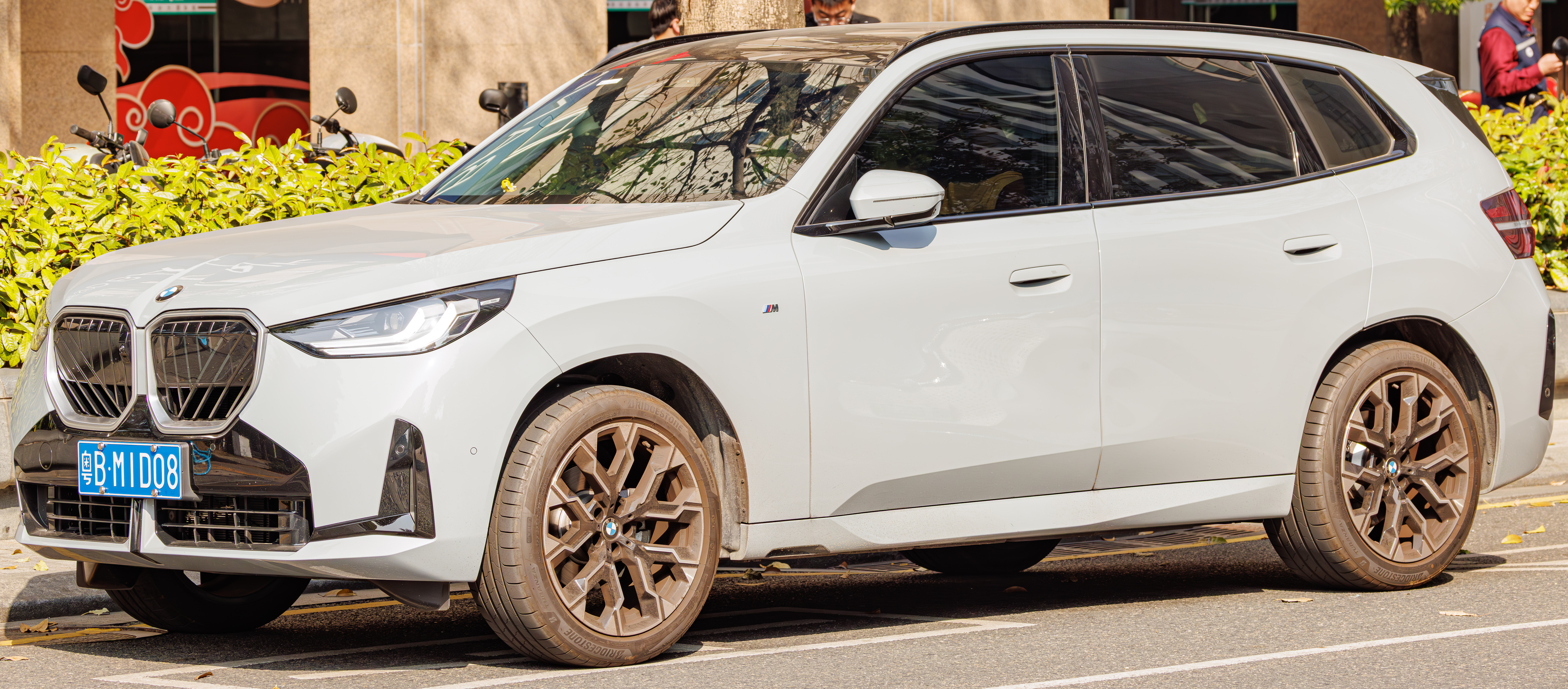
BMW Brilliance X3-Series G48

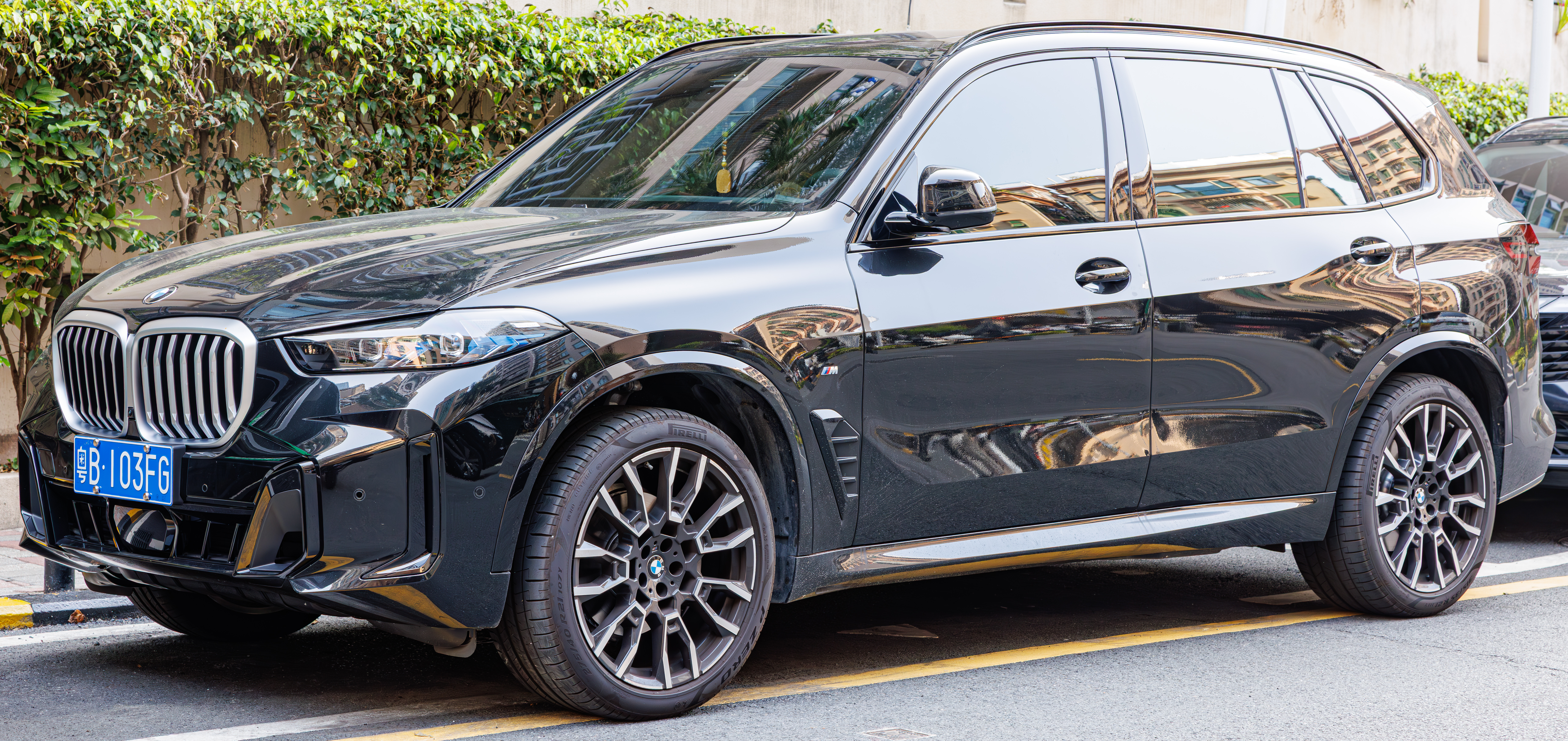
BMW Brilliance X5-Series G18

=== Former ===
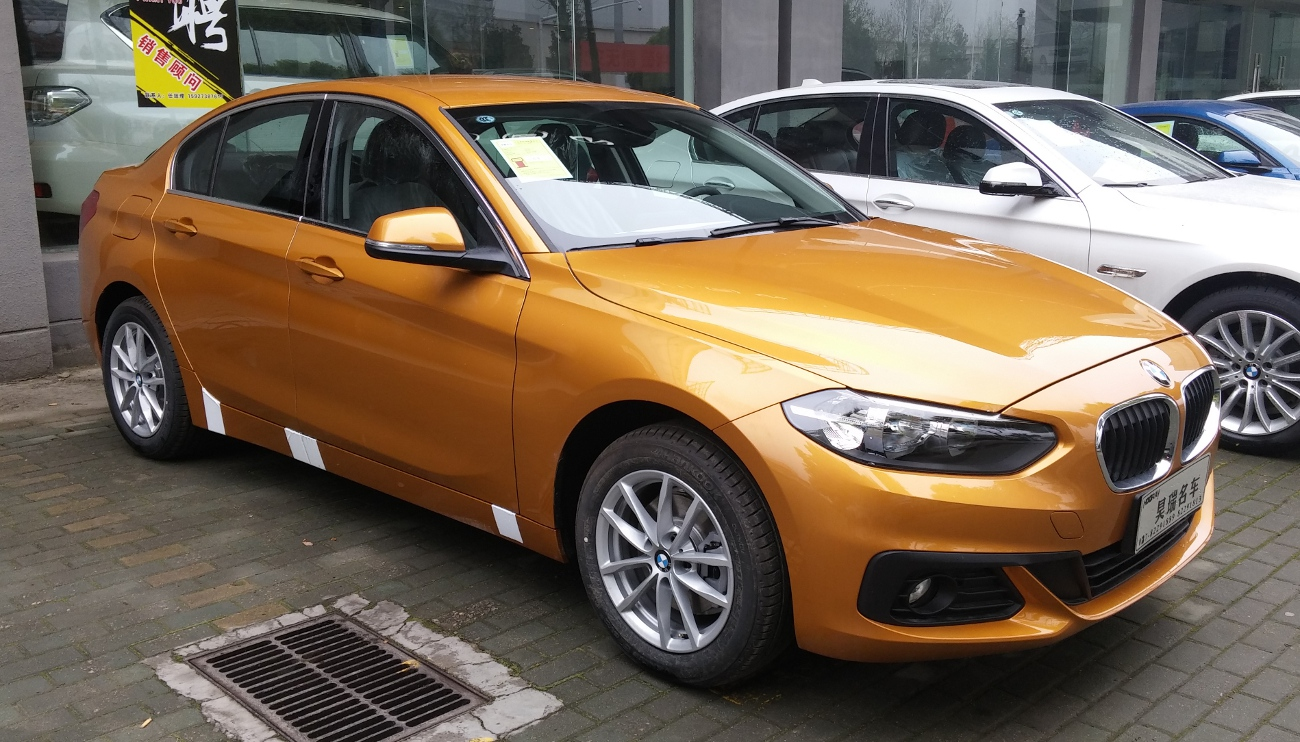
BMW Brilliance 1-Series F52

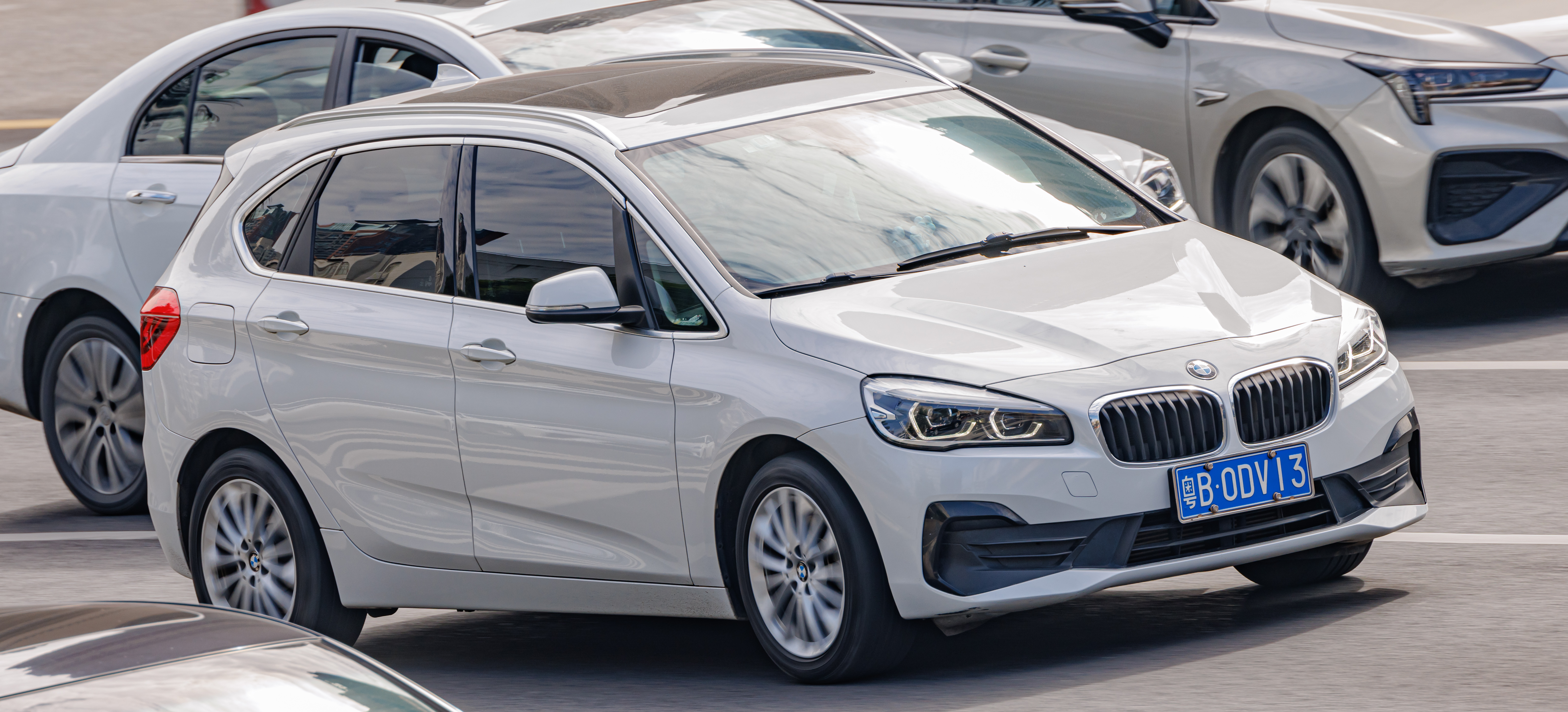
BMW Brilliance 2-Series Active Tourer F45

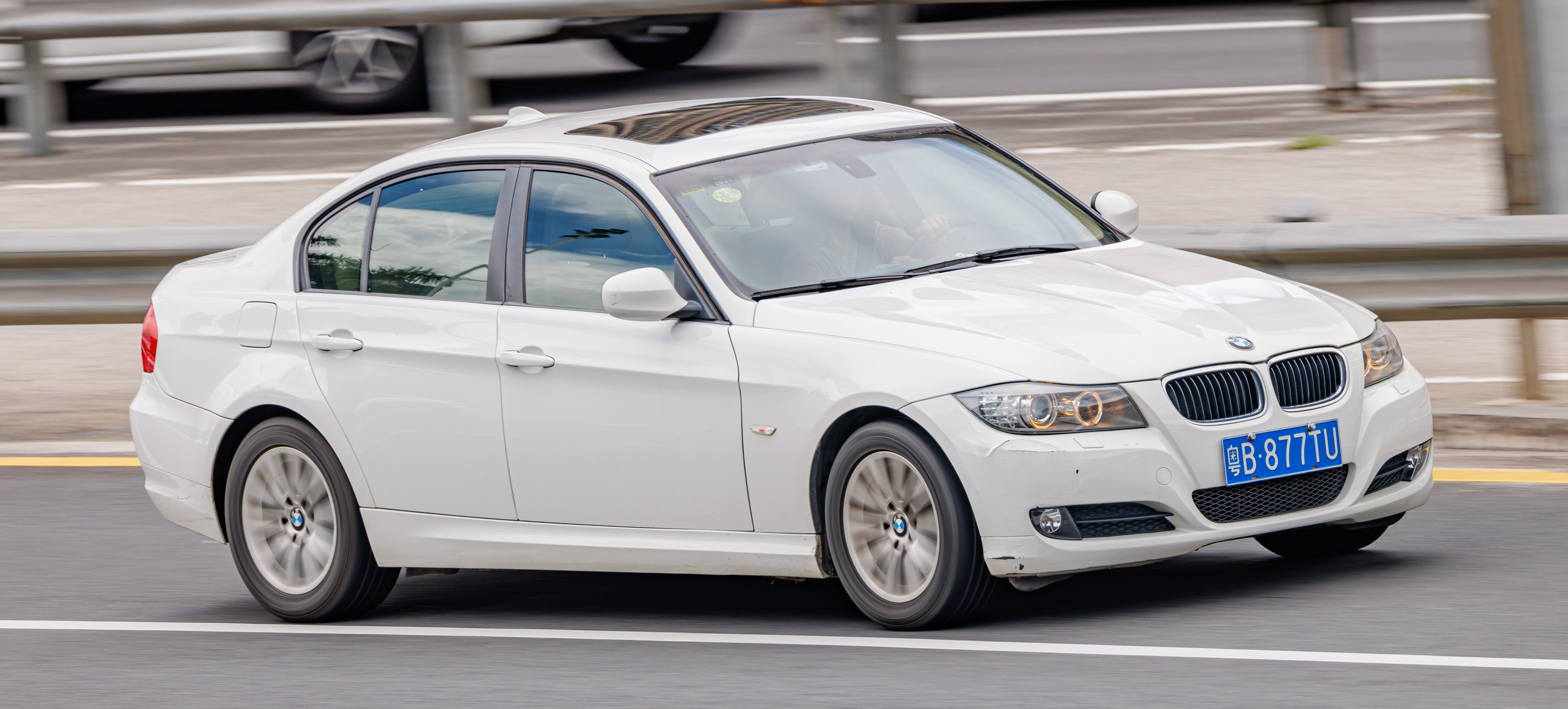
BMW Brilliance 3-Series E90

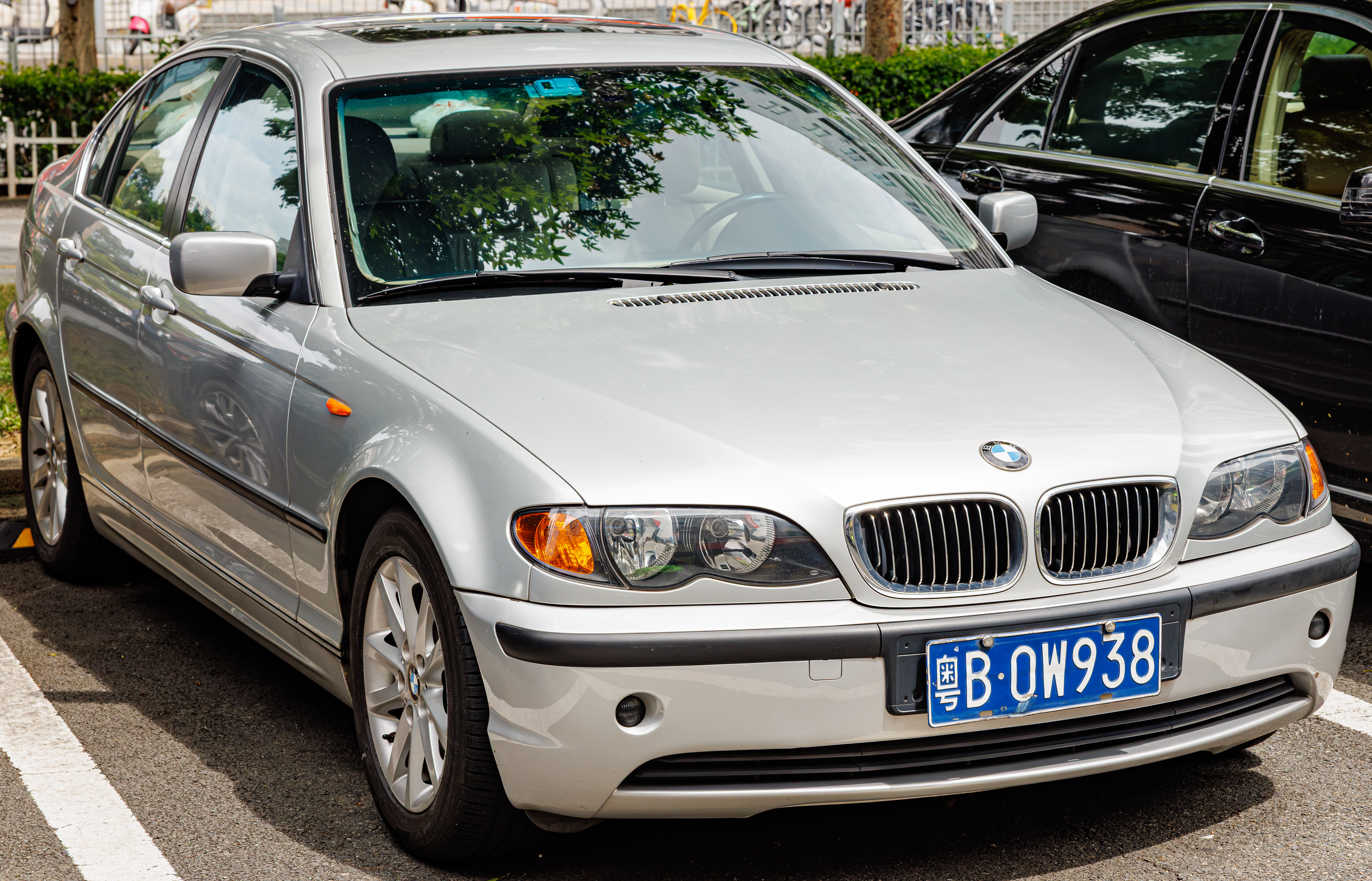
BMW Brilliance 3-Series E46

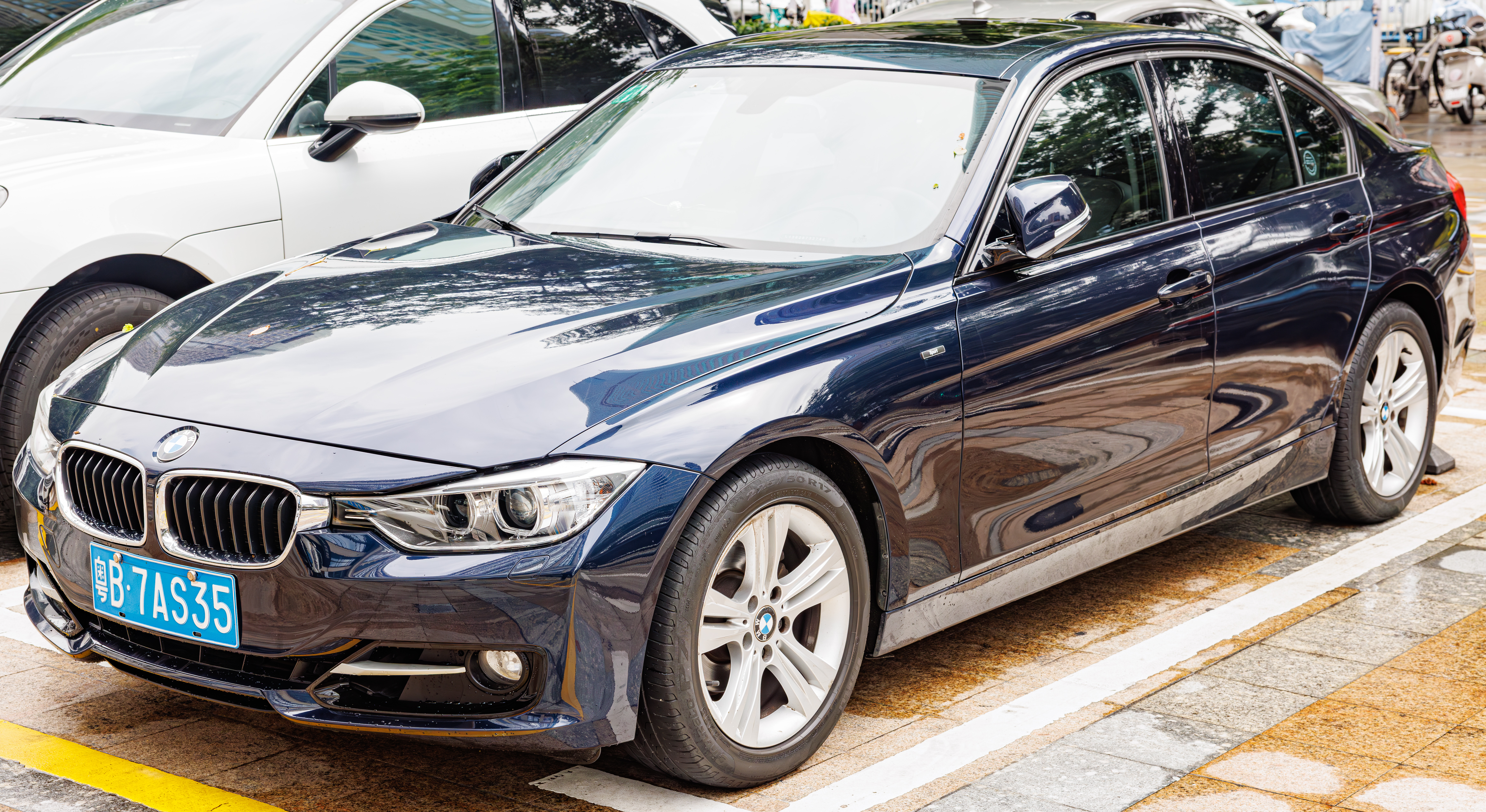
BMW Brilliance 3-Series F30

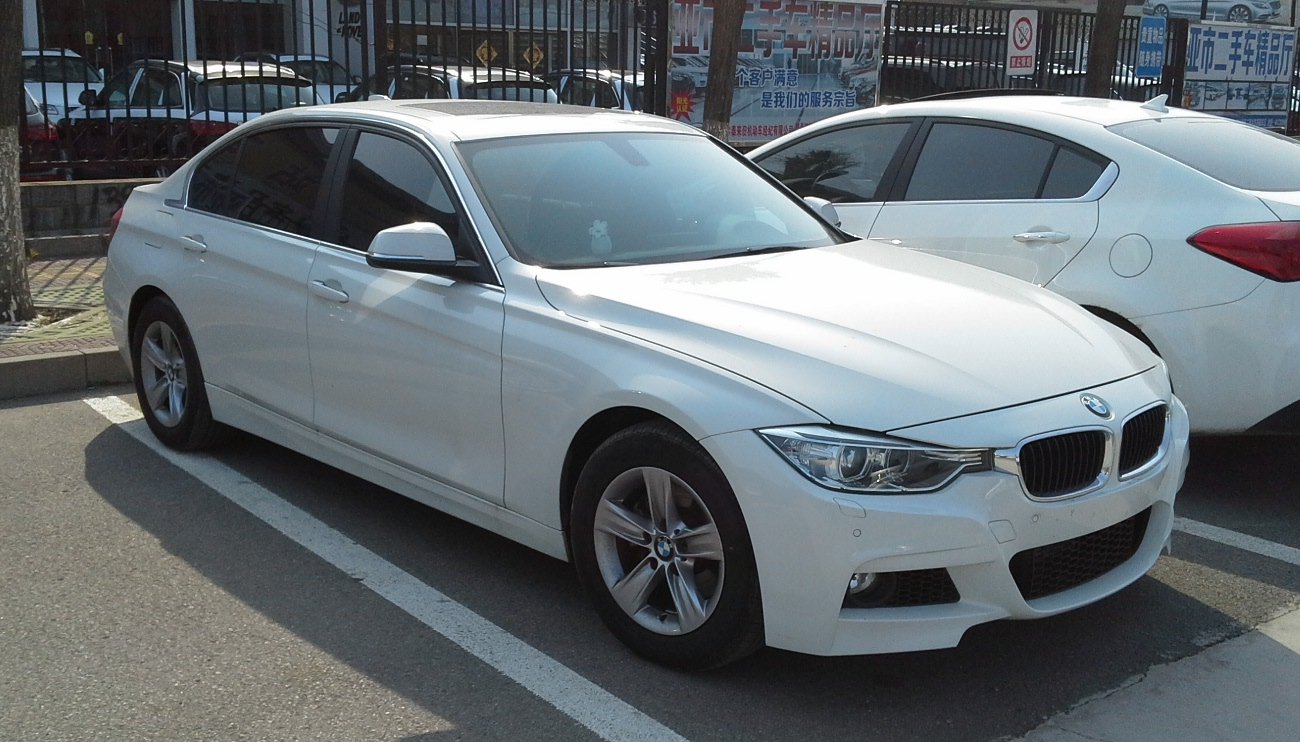
BMW Brilliance 3-Series F35 Li

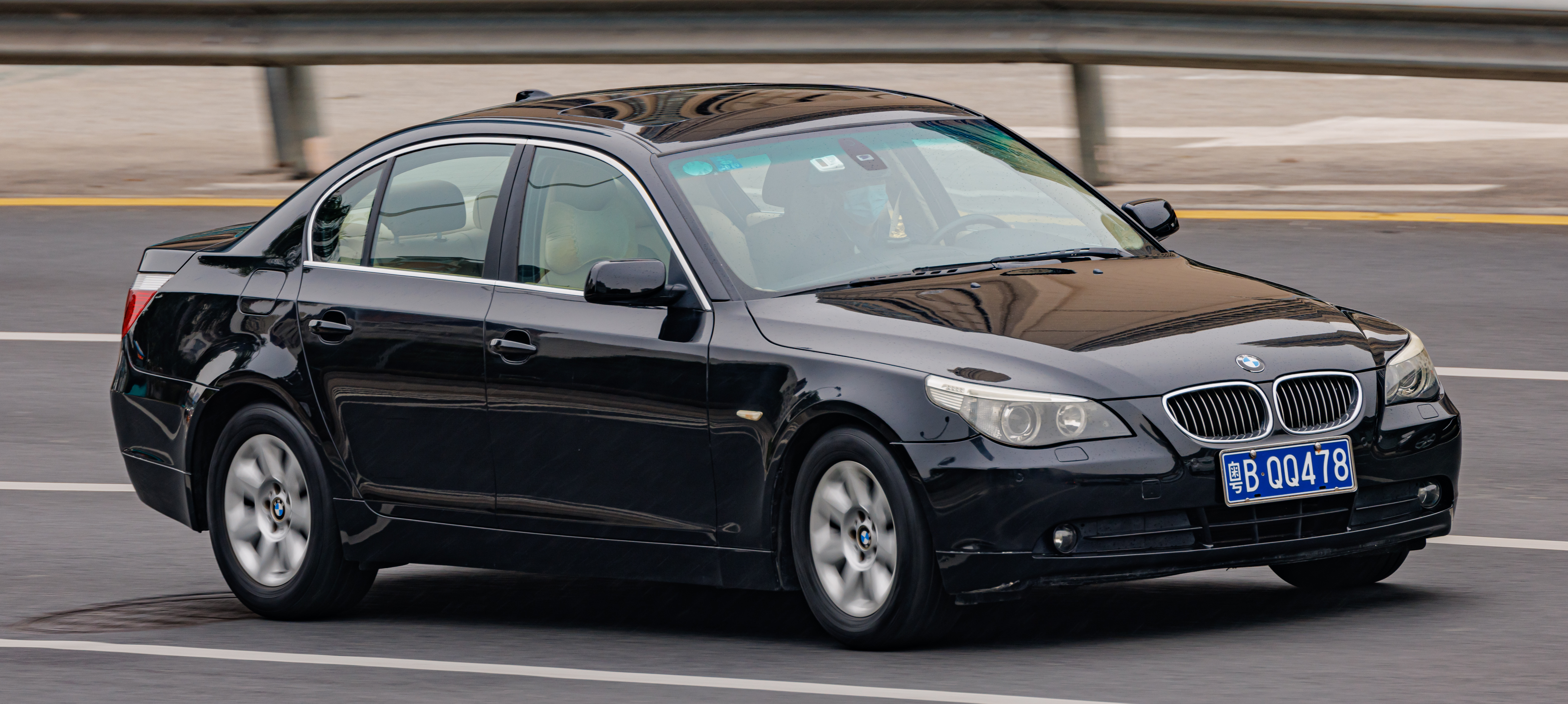
BMW Brilliance 5-Series E60

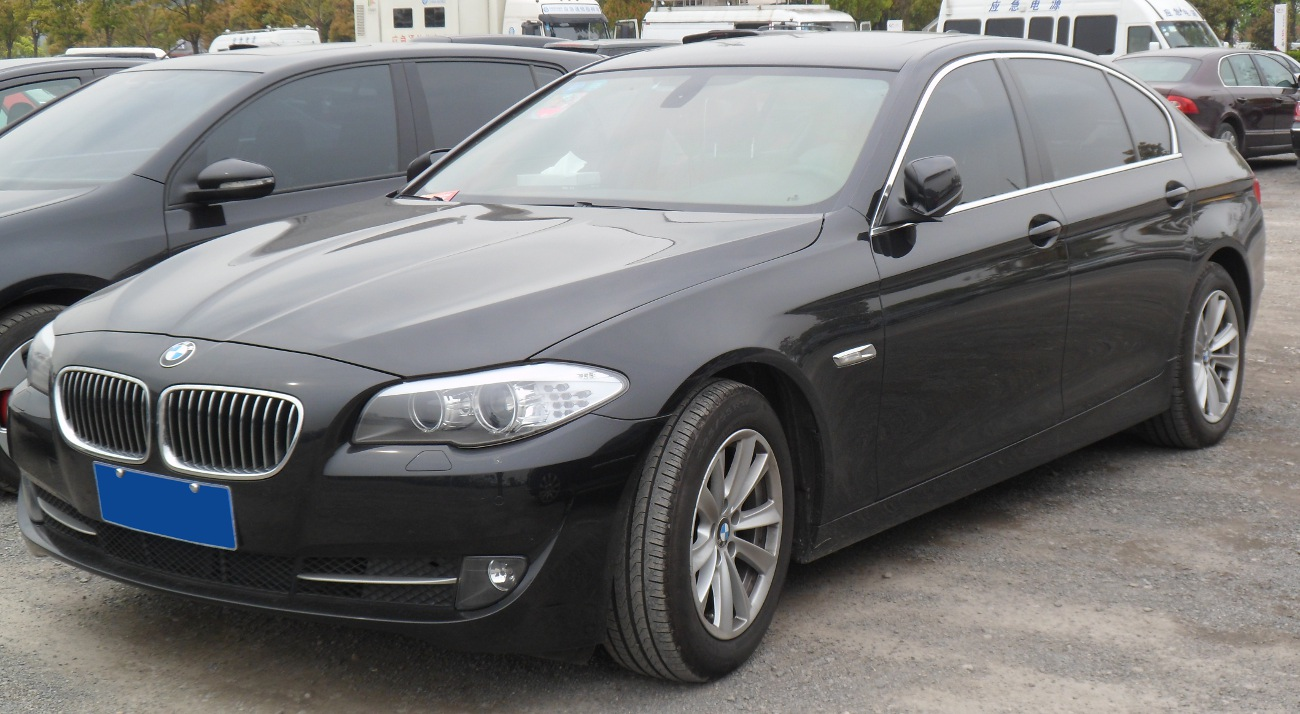
BMW Brilliance 5-Series F18 Li

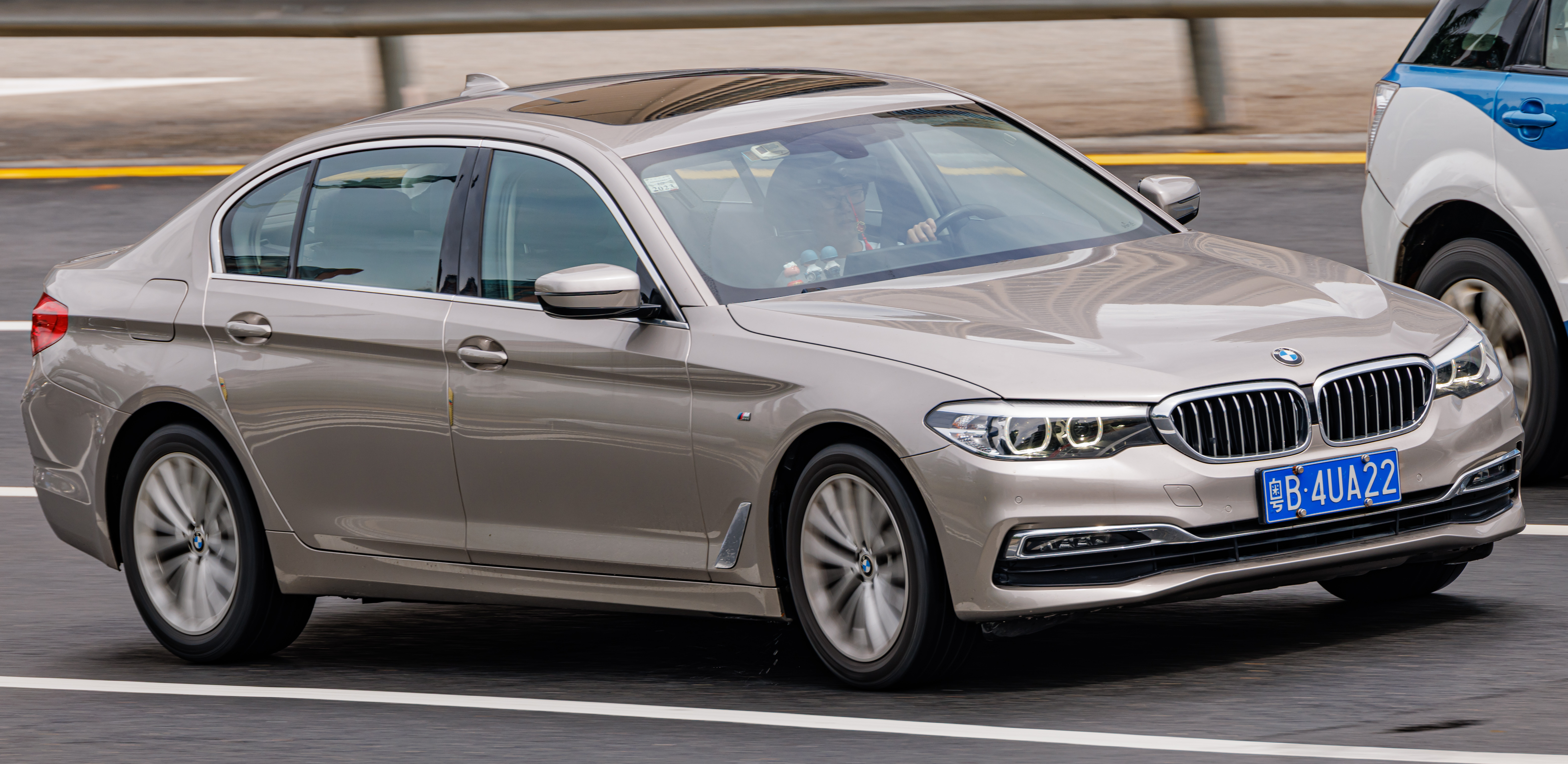
BMW Brilliance 5-Series G38 Li

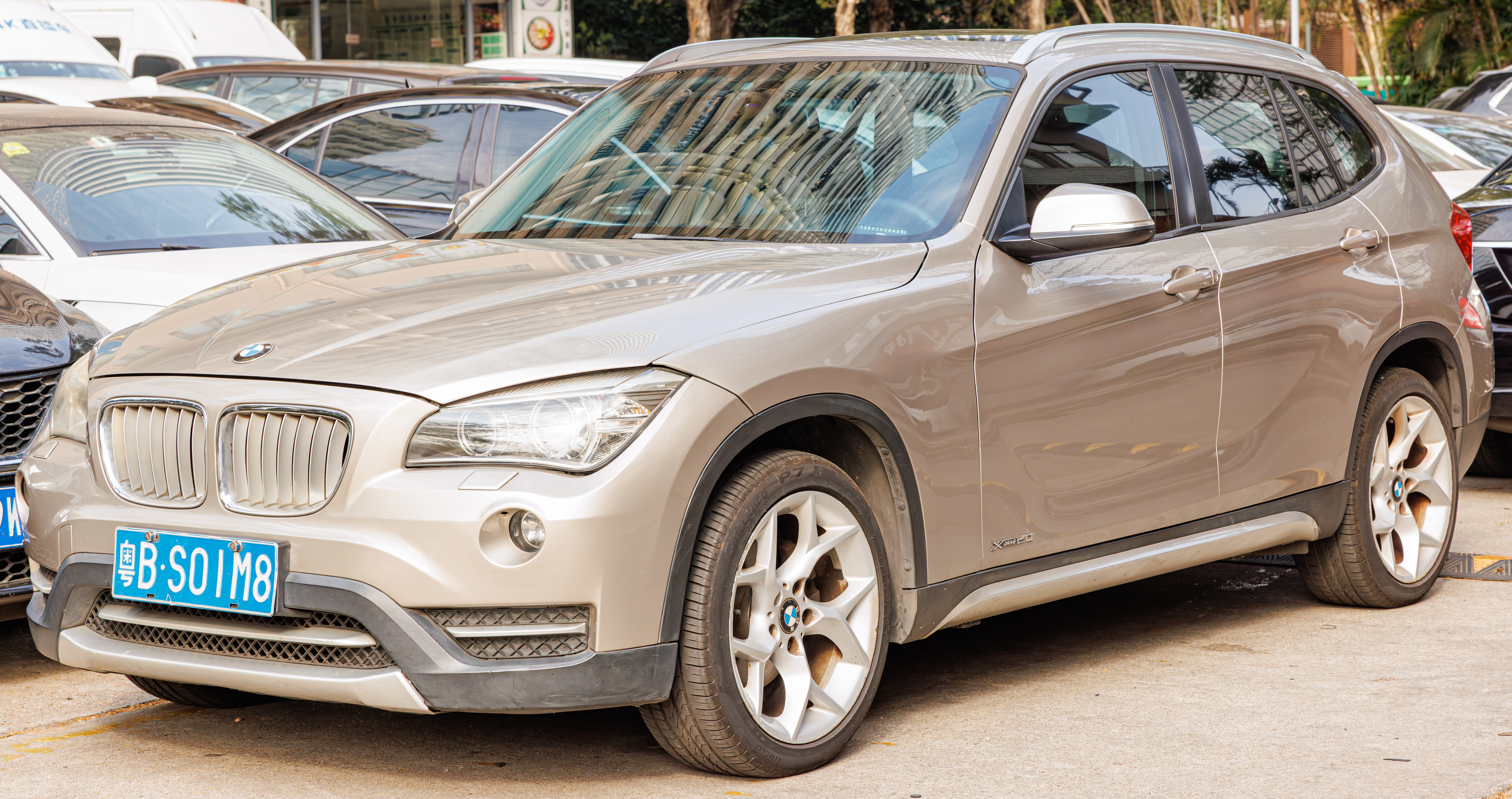
BMW Brilliance X1-Series E84

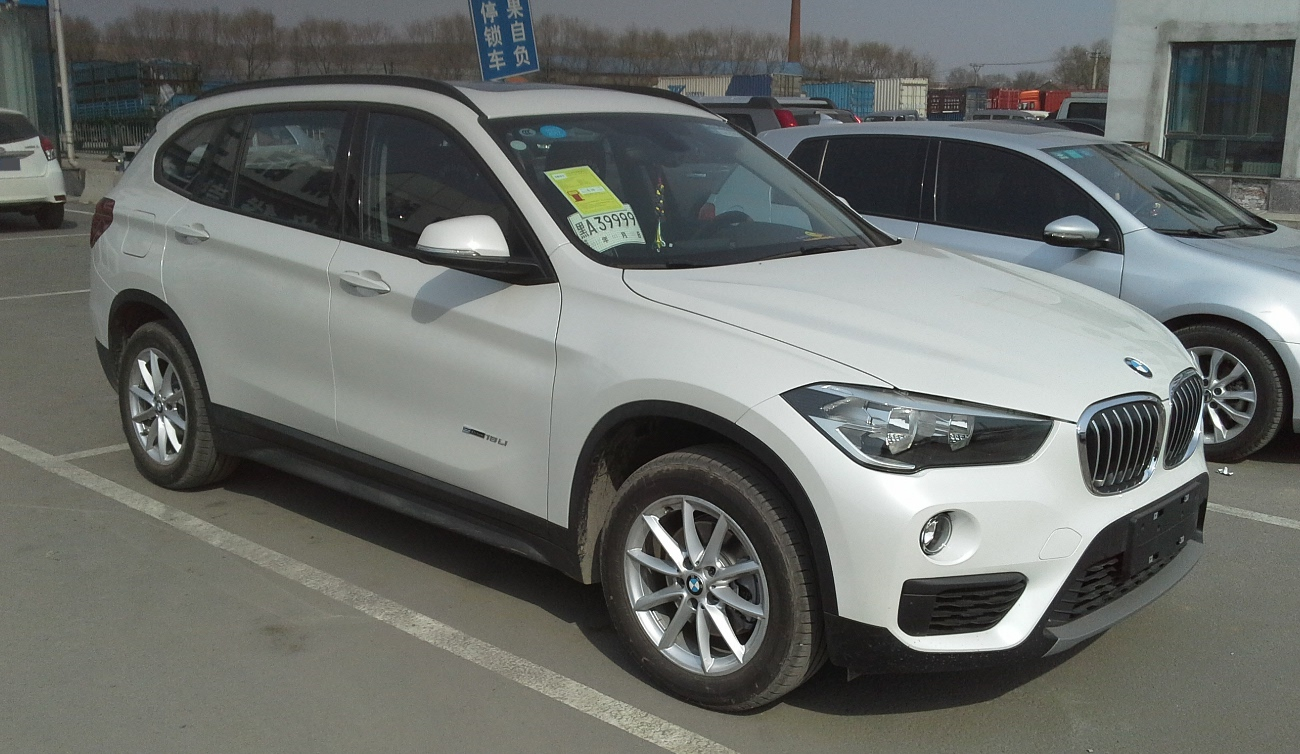
BMW Brilliance X1-Series F49 Li

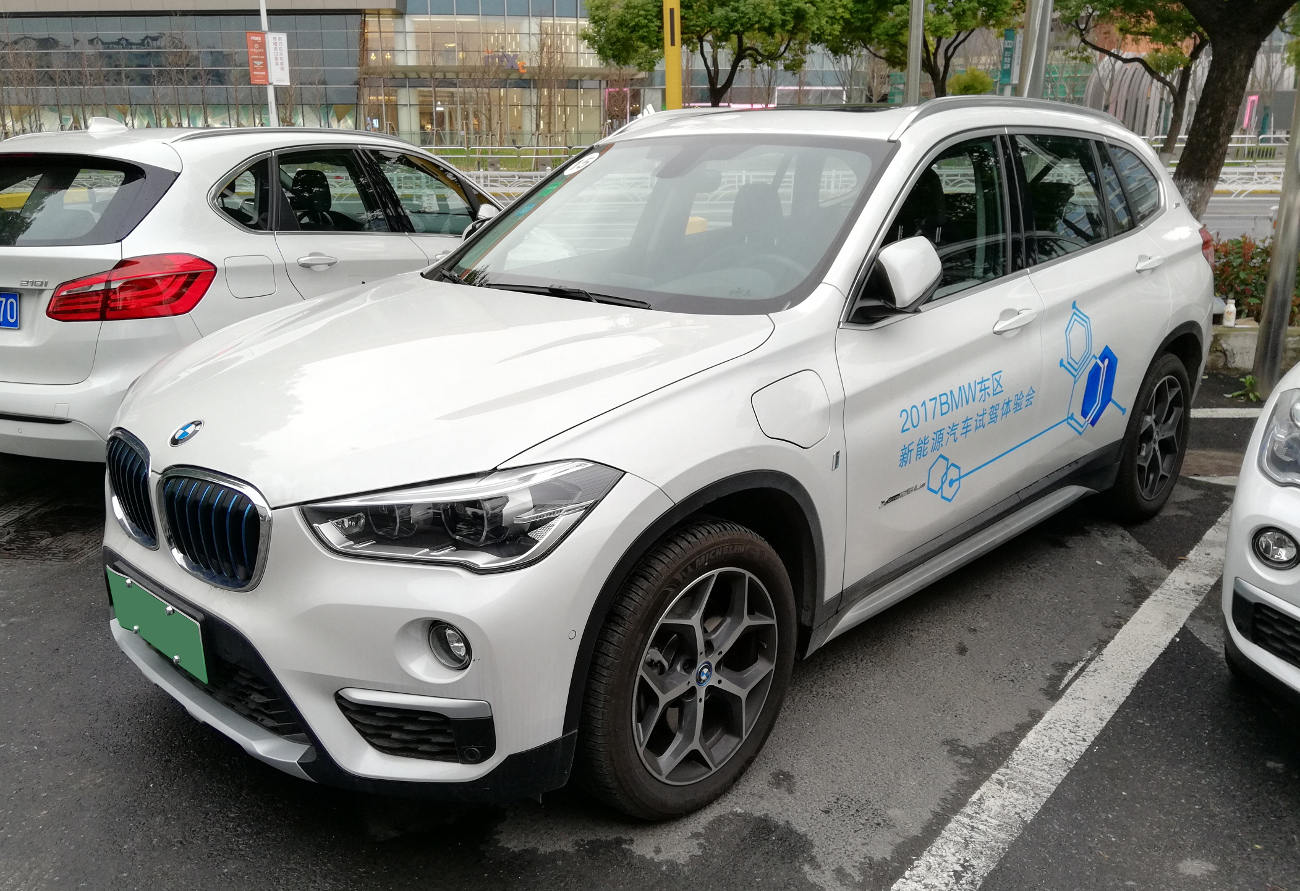
BMW Brilliance X1-Series F49 Le

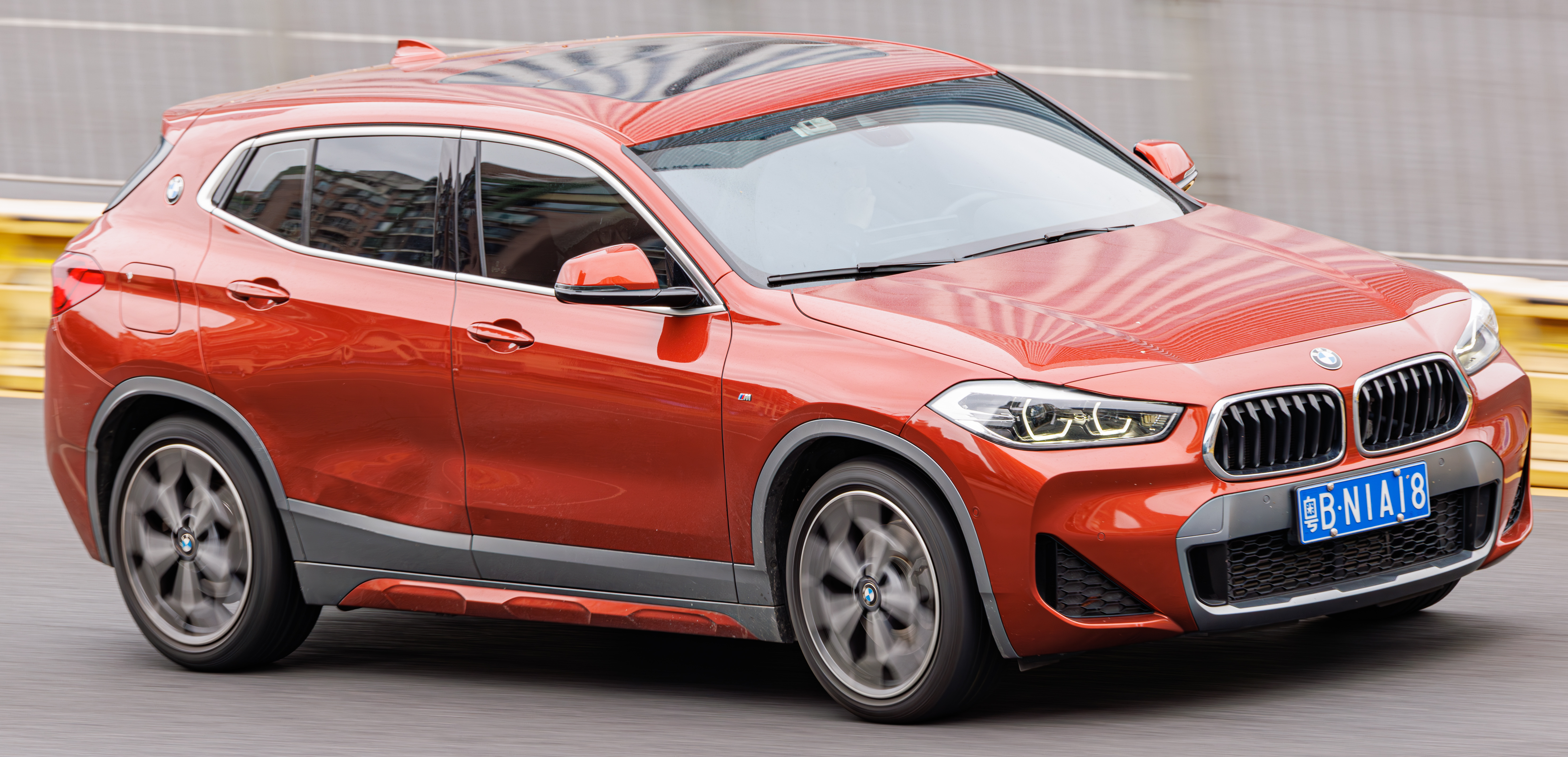
BMW Brilliance X2-Series F39

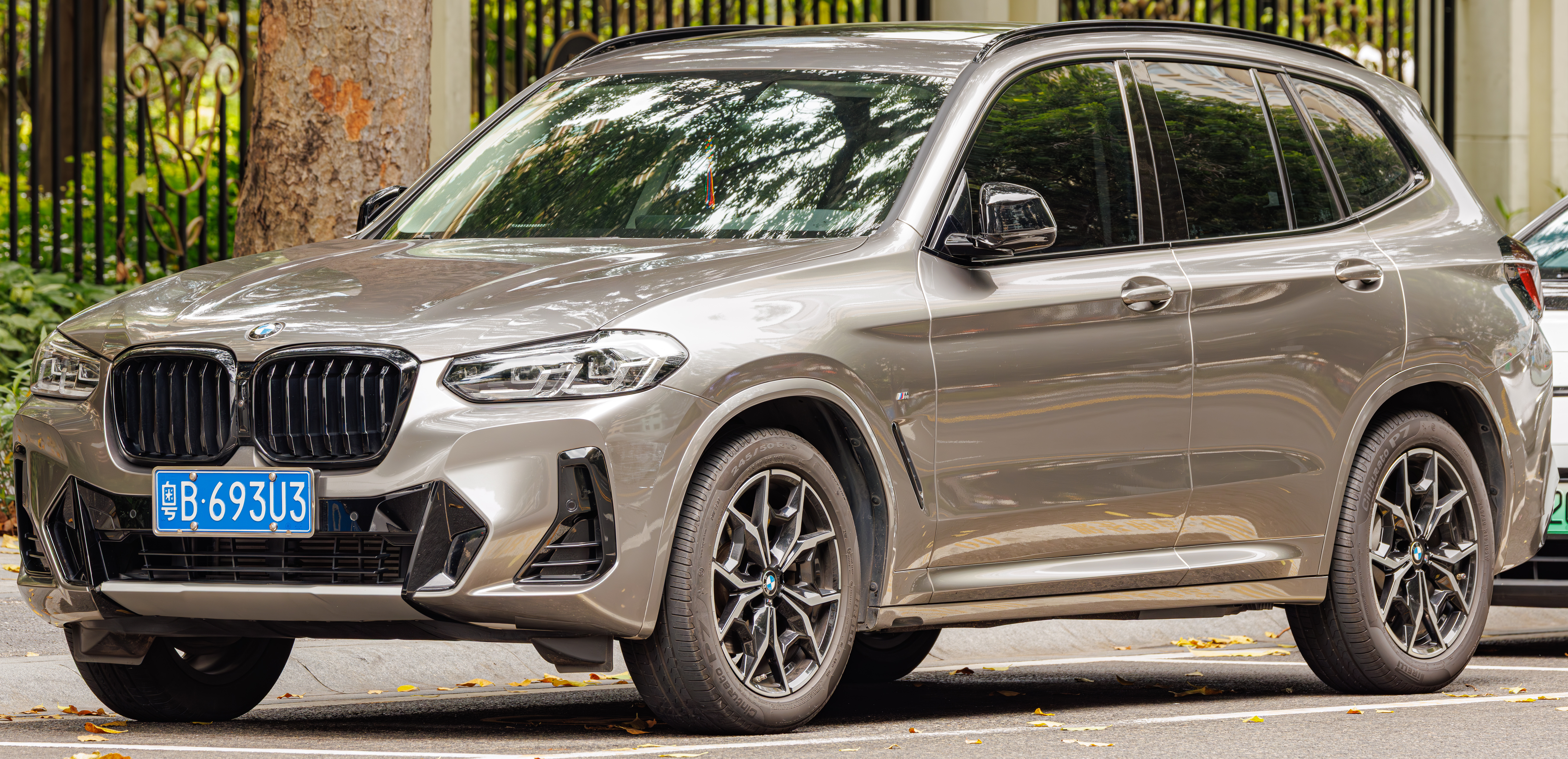
BMW Brilliance X3-Series G01

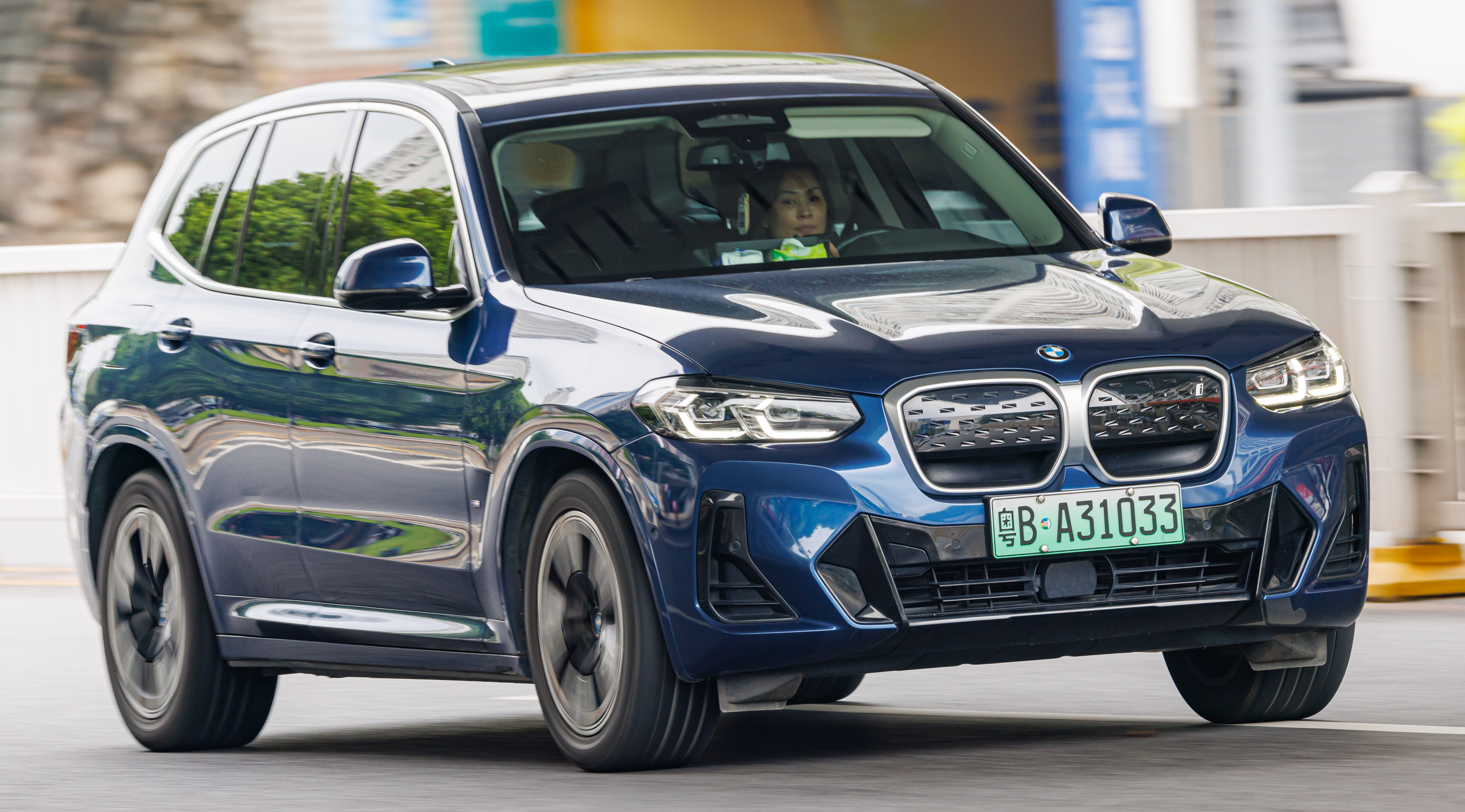
BMW Brilliance iX3 G08

=== Zinoro vehicles ===
Zinoro is a vehicle brand under BMW Brilliance specializing in electric vehicles.

- Zinoro 1E
- Zinoro 60H
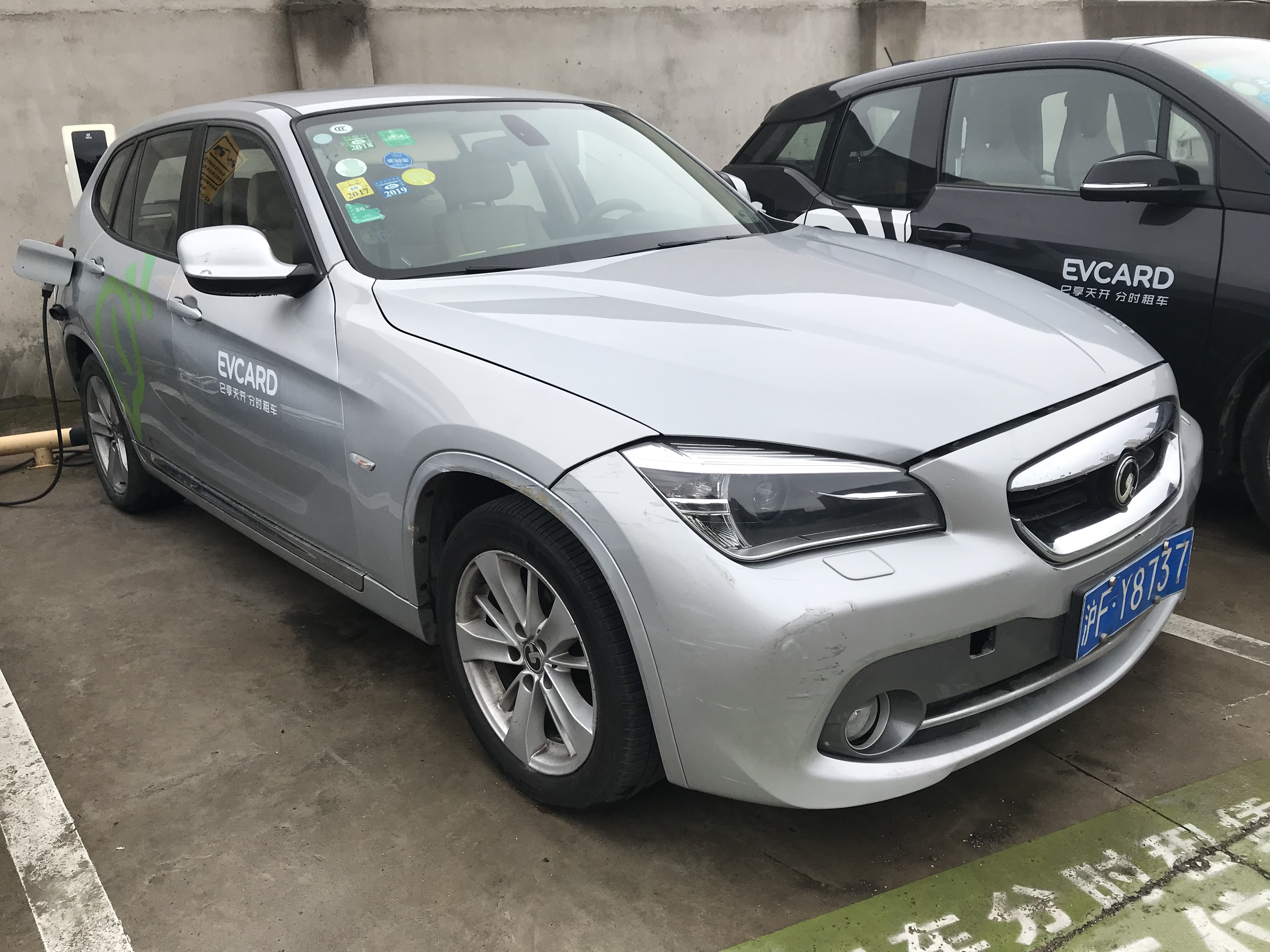
Zinoro 1E

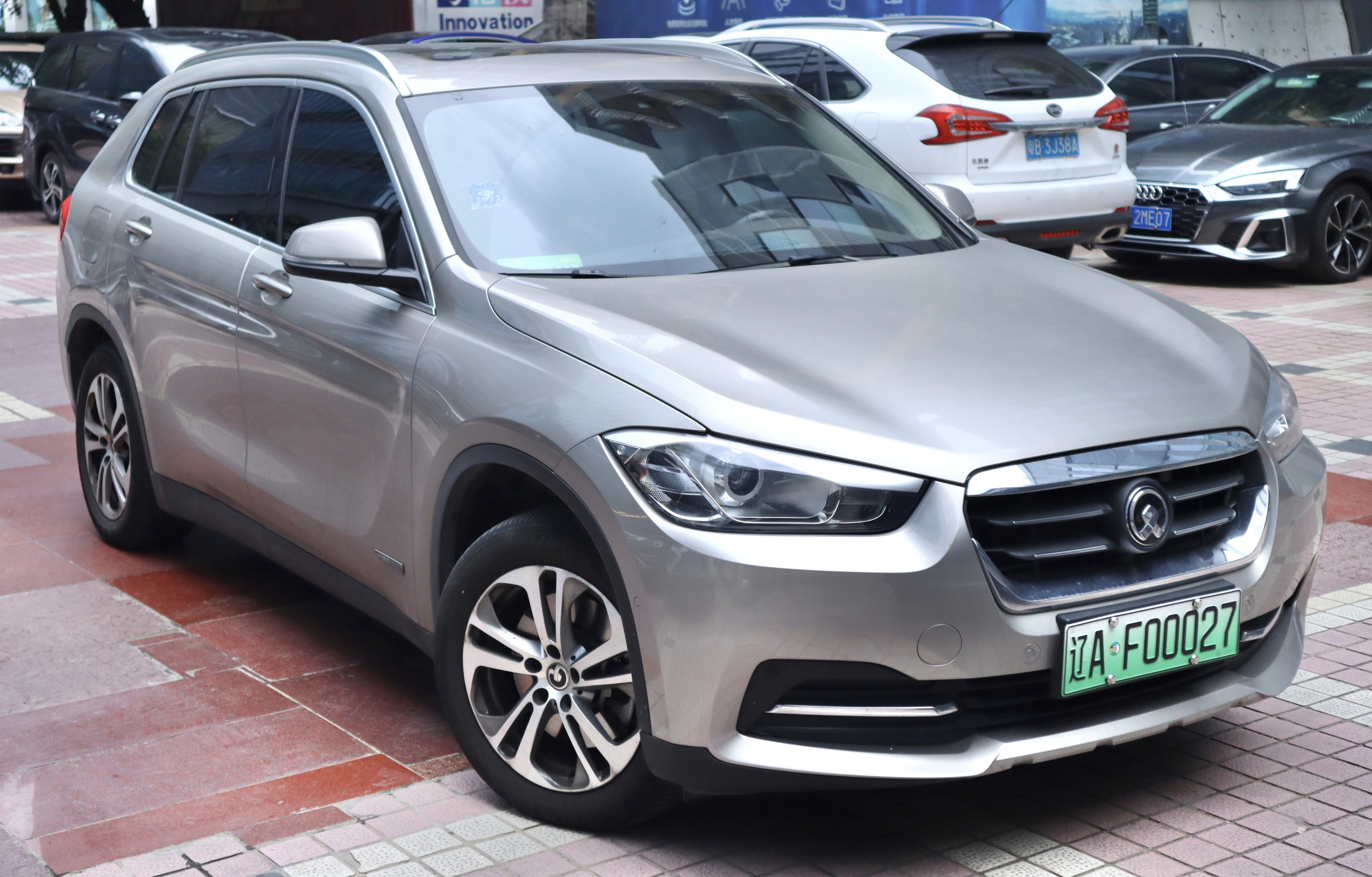
Zinoro 60H

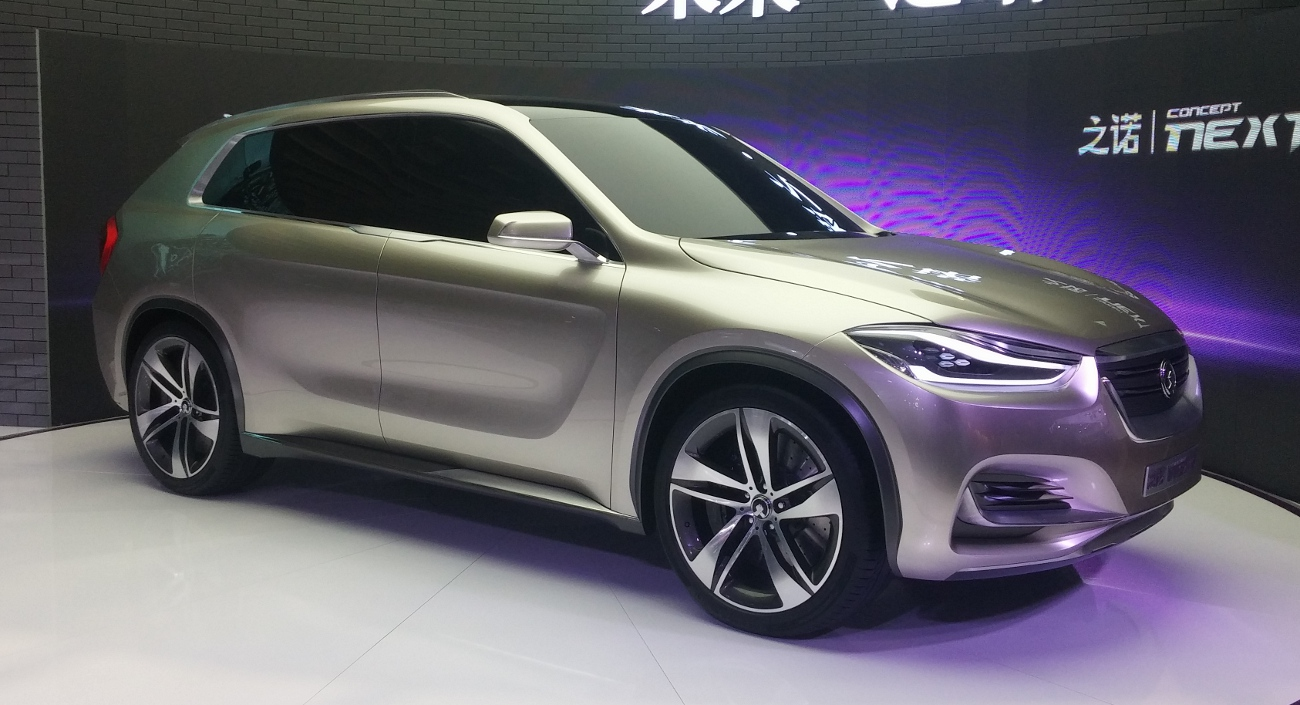
Zinoro Concept Next

== Sales ==
Calendar year	Total sales (vehicles produced in China)
2005	N/A
2006	22,500
2007	30,600
2008	N/A
2009	44,888
2010	N/A
2011	108,189
2012	N/A
