= BMW i3 (NA0) =

Compact luxury electric sedan

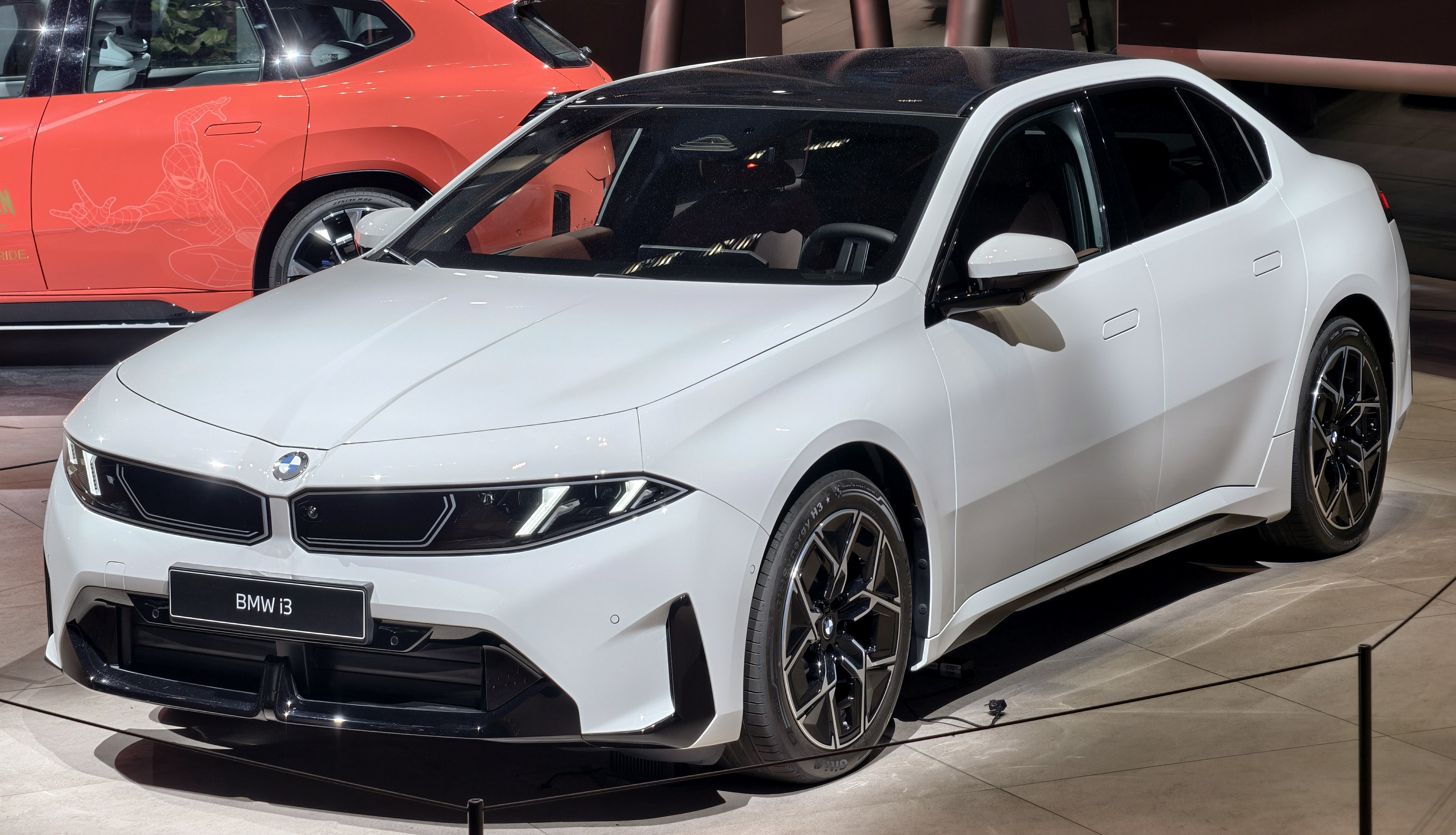

Overview
- Manufacturer: BMW
- Model code: NA0; NA8 (long-wheelbase sedan); ZA0 (M3)
- Production: August 2026 – present
- Model years: 2027
- Assembly: Germany: Munich (BMW Group Plant Munich); China: Dadong (BBA, LWB)
- Designer: Anders Thøgersen under Adrian van Hooydonk

Body and chassis
- Class: Compact executive car (D)
- Body style: 4-door sedan
- Layout: Rear-motor, rear-wheel-drive (i3 40L/50L); Dual-motor, all-wheel-drive (i3 40/50 xDrive / M60 xDrive M Performance); Quad motors, individual wheel drive (M3)
- Platform: Neue Klasse NAx platform
- Related: BMW iX3 (NA5)

Powertrain
- Electric motor: AC induction (front) (HF1001N0 front and HD1002N0 rear); Externally-excited synchronous (rear)
- Power output: RWD eDrive: 335 hp (250 kW; 340 PS) (i3 40L); 463 hp (345 kW; 469 PS) (i3 50L); AWD xDrive: 374 hp (279 kW; 379 PS) (i3 40 xDrive); 463 hp (345 kW; 469 PS) (i3 50 xDrive); 603 hp (450 kW; 611 PS) (i3 60 xDrive M Performance)
- Transmission: Single-speed gear reduction
- Battery: 87 kWh NMC CATL (i3 40 xDrive /i3 40L); 108.7 kWh NMC EVE Energy (i3 50 xDrive); 113.4 kWh 800V–Technology NMC Cylindrical Cells Gen6 (i3 50L); 100 kWh 800V–Technology NMC Cylindrical Cells Gen6 (M3)
- Electric range: Up to 440 mi (710 km) (EPA); Up to 912 km (567 mi) (WLTP); Up to 1,213 km (754 mi) (CLTC)
- Plug-in charging: DC: up to 400 kW (10–80% in 21 min); AC: 11 kW (22 kW optional)

Dimensions
- Wheelbase: 2,897 mm (114.1 in); 3,006 mm (118.3 in) (LWB)
- Length: 4,760 mm (187.4 in); 4,864 mm (191.5 in) (LWB)
- Width: 1,865 mm (73.4 in)
- Height: 1,480 mm (58.3 in); 1,490 mm (58.7 in) (LWB)
- Curb weight: 2,205 kg (4,861 lb) (DIN, i3 50 xDrive)

Chronology
- Predecessor: BMW i4; BMW i3 (G28) (China)

The BMW i3 (internal code: NA0) is a battery-electric compact executive car manufactured by BMW. It is the first battery-electric BMW with a 3 Series designation to be offered outside China, following the China-market BMW i3 (G28), and the second production model of BMW's Neue Klasse generation, following the BMW iX3.

It is part of the eighth generation of the BMW 3 Series range, along with the mechanically unrelated internal combustion engine variants - the BMW G50 (sedan) and BMW G51 (wagon, marketed as 'Touring'). With those it shares the Neue Klasse-specific design language, while its powertrain and associated technical systems distinguish it from the other models. The "i3" name was previously used from 2013 to 2022 for the BMW i3 (I01), a compact electric car, and since 2022 for the G28 in China. The NA0 is a technically distinct vehicle in a different market segment.

It was revealed 18 March 2026 and started sales in the third quarter of that same year. Additionally, a station wagon "Touring" variant was teased during the end of the i3's presentation. BMW states that it will start producing the i3 in August 2026.

== Development and launch ==
=== Concept and development ===
The i3 was previewed by several concept cars showing the Neue Klasse generation as a whole, including the BMW i Vision Dee, BMW Vision Neue Klasse in 2023, and the BMW Vision Driving Experience in 2025. They showed a new, simpler form language that was simpler and included references to classic BMWs.

=== Reveal and market launch ===
The i3 production model was unveiled on 18 March 2026 with one specification - the i3 50 xDrive.

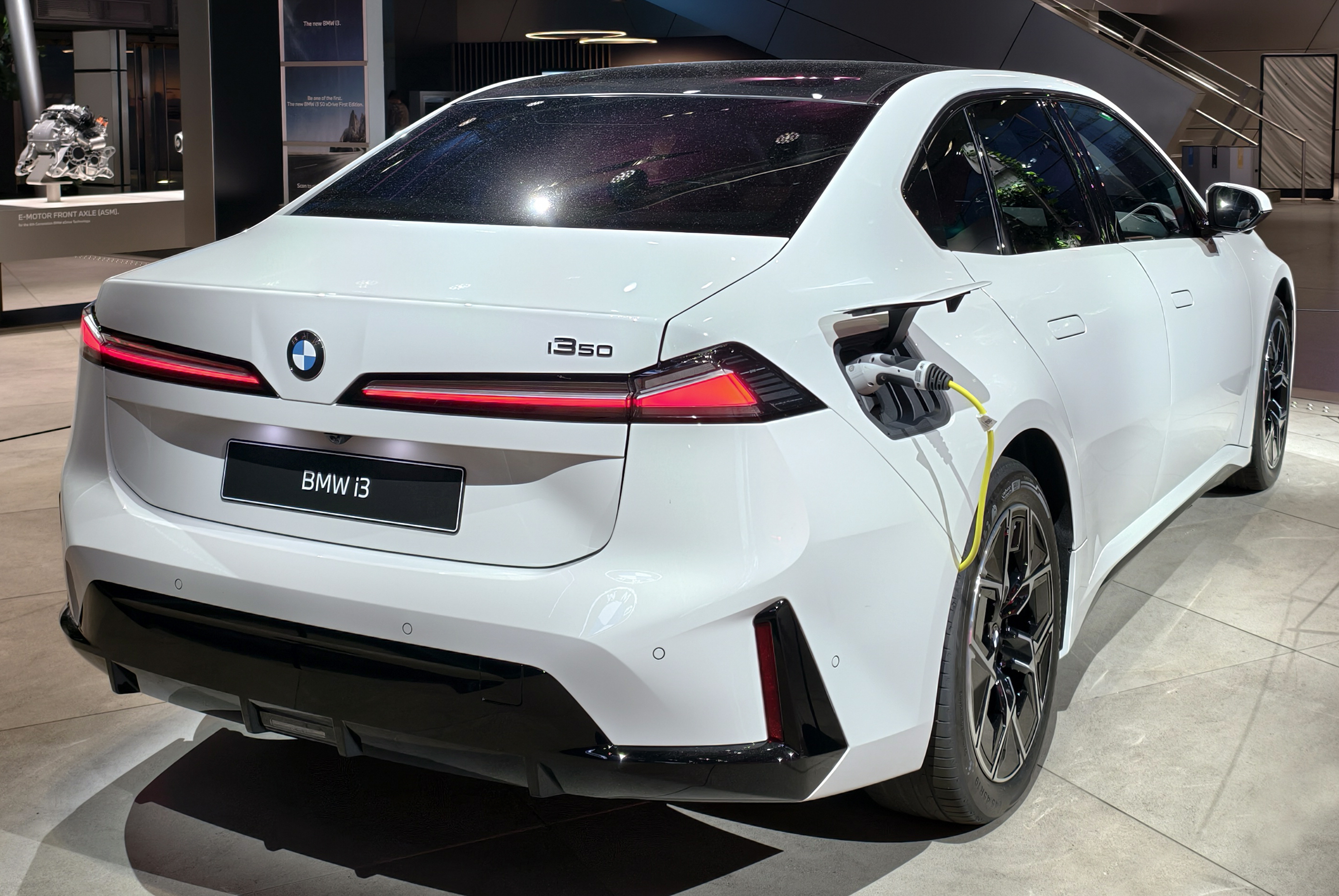
Rear view

Interior

With the market launch announced on 30 September 2026, BMW offers two all-wheel-drive versions of the BMW i3 at launch, the BMW i3 50 xDrive and the BMW i3 40 xDrive, with the BMW i3 M60 xDrive following in 2027. German starting prices are €59,900 for the BMW i3 40 xDrive and €65,900 for the BMW i3 50 xDrive.

=== Design ===
Similar to the iX3 (NA5), the i3 uses BMW's radical Neue Klasse design language, with the signature twin kidney grilles merged with the dual headlights, a reduced form language and cleaner lines. The interior sports a minimalist, more geometric design.

== Production and Markets ==
=== Production ===
Series production for the European market runs at BMW's Munich plant, starting in August 2026. The BMW i3 is built at the BMW Group plant Munich, while combustion-engined 3 Series models are built in Dingolfing. Core components of the electric drive and the combustion engines come from the Steyr plant (Austria), and the high-voltage batteries from the Irlbach-Straßkirchen plant.

=== Europe ===
The First Edition was available to order as a limited offer from 18 June 2026, ahead of the official market launch on 30 September 2026; since then, the model has been fully configurable. In Germany, the First Edition was priced at €75,340. According to BMW's German model page, an expanded model programme will be orderable from autumn 2026.

=== United States ===
The BMW i3 Sedan will be available in the US in 2027. US reservations opened earlier than originally planned, at the end of September 2026; the first US cars, initially only the i3 50 xDrive, are expected to ship in the first quarter of 2027.

=== China ===
The Chinese market exclusively receives a long-wheelbase variant of the i3, with first details revealed before the Beijing Auto Show on 22 April 2026 and is expected to go on sale in late 2026. Production is planned to begin in January 2027. The wheelbase has been stretched by 108 mm (4.3 in) to 3,006 mm (118.3 in). The pop-out door handles have been replaced by pocket-style door handles to comply with local safety regulations, and the 'M' badge on the C-pillar is illuminated. BMW says it will get over 1,000 km (620 mi) of range on the CLTC cycle.

BMW i3 40L

Rear view

Interior

== Technology and powertrain ==
=== Battery ===
Similar to the iX3, the i3 is built on an 800-volt architecture. The i3 50 xDrive features a 108 kWh (usable) NMC lithium-ion battery that offering up to 440 mi (710 km) of EPA range and 912 km (567 mi) of WLTP range. It is capable of DC fast charging up to 400 kW, going from 10% to 80% in 21 minutes and adding 263 miles (423 km) of range in 10 minutes. It supports V2H, V2G, and V2L bidirectional charging functions.

=== Powertrain ===
The i3 50 xDrive has a dual-motor all-wheel drive layout producing 463 hp (345 kW) and 476 lb⋅ft (645 N⋅m) of torque. It also features the "Heart of Joy" supercomputer as a part of the Neue Klasse platform.
