= BMW 3 Series (G50) =

Eighth generation of BMW 3 Series

Overview
- Manufacturer: BMW
- Model code: G50 (sedan); G58 (long-wheelbase sedan)
- Production: November 2026 – present
- Model years: 2028
- Assembly: Germany: Dingolfing (Dingolfing Plant); China: Dadong (BBA, LWB)
- Designer: Anders Thøgersen under Adrian van Hooydonk

Body and chassis
- Class: Compact executive car (D)
- Body style: 4-door sedan
- Layout: Front-engine, rear-wheel-drive; Front-engine, four-wheel-drive (xDrive)
- Platform: BMW CLAR platform

Powertrain
- Engine: Petrol: 2.0 L B48 turbo I4; 3.0 L B58 turbo I6
- Power output: 115 kW (154 hp; 156 PS) (318); 155 kW (208 hp; 211 PS) (320); 172 kW (231 hp; 234 PS) (325L); 190 kW (250 hp; 260 PS) (330 xDrive); 211 kW (283 hp; 287 PS) (330L); 326 kW (437 hp; 443 PS) (M350 xDrive)
- Transmission: 8-Speed ZF 8HP Automatic

Dimensions
- Wheelbase: 2,860 mm (112.6 in); 2,970 mm (116.9 in) (LWB)
- Length: 4,765 mm (187.6 in); 4,865 mm (191.5 in) (LWB)
- Width: 1,850 mm (72.8 in); 1,852 mm (72.9 in) (LWB)
- Height: 1,455 mm (57.3 in); 1,461 mm (57.5 in) (LWB)
- Curb weight: 1,935 kg (4,266 lb)

Chronology
- Predecessor: BMW 3 Series (G20)

The eighth generation of the BMW 3 Series range consists of the internal combustion BMW G50 and the battery electric BMW i3 (NA0). Although they are completely mechanically unrelated, with the internal combustion models based on an updated version of the CLAR platform used in the G20, and the battery electric models based on the new Neue Klasse NAx platform, they are both marketed under the 3 Series lineup simply as parallel powertrain options.

== Overview ==
Rear view

The G50 3 Series was previewed by several concept cars that generally showcased the Neue Klasse generation a whole, including the BMW i Vision Dee, BMW Vision Neue Klasse and the BMW Vision Driving Experience.

It was revealed on 30 September 2026, six months after the reveal of the NA0.

=== Design and features ===
The radical Neue Klasse design language is used in the exterior, featuring slimmer double kidney grilles merged with the headlights, simplified body lines and an angular rear end. Although the design is nearly identical to that of the NA0 i3, the two are completely mechanically unrelated, with slight differences in proportion in order to accommodate the varying powertrains. The M350 xDrive features exclusive yellow daytime running lights.

Similar other Neue Klasse models, the interior was also radically redesigned, featuring the Panoramic iDrive system, running on BMW's iDrive X operating system. This includes a customizable 43.3-inch "Panoramic Vision Display", which is a darkened area across the base of the windshield where vital driving information is projected. A hexagonal 17.9-inch central display is used for main infotainment functions. Furthermore, a 3D heads up display is optionally available. AI models such as the Amazon Alexa+ have been integrated into the software. It has a trunk capacity of 450 L (16 cu ft).

New passive dampers are equipped as standard, with adaptive suspension being optional. A new "Drift Moment" feature is available on the M350 xDrive, temporarily shifting to a rear wheel drive configuration in order to perform drifts.

== Markets ==
=== China ===
In the Chinese market, the G50 Series receives an exclusive long-wheelbase variant, codenamed the G58. It was revealed on 5 November 2026 through China's Ministry of Industry and Information Technology. It features a wheelbase extended by 110 mm (4.3 in) with an overall length extended by 100 mm (3.9 in). It follows other changes adopted by the similarly China-exclusive i3 L (NA8), replacing hidden door handles with traditional semi-hidden units, while adding an illuminated "M" logo on the C-pillar.

== Powertrain ==
Multiple 48-volt mild hybrid petrol powertrains were revealed at launch.The 318 produces 154 hp (115 kW) and 184 lb⋅ft (249 N⋅m) of torque, while the 320 produces 208 hp (155 kW) and 243 lb⋅ft (329 N⋅m) of torque. The 330 produces 255 hp (190 kW) and 220 lb⋅ft (298 N⋅m) of torque. The 320 accelerates from 0 to 100 km/h (62 mph) in 7.4 seconds, while the 330 accelerates from 0 to 100 km/h in approximately 6.1 seconds, reaching a top speed of 149 mph (240 km/h). Meanwhile, the M350 xDrive uses a turbocharged 3.0-liter inline-six engine, producing 437 hp (326 kW) and 428 lb⋅ft (580 N⋅m) of torque. It accelerates from 0 to 100 km/h (62 mph) in 4.1 seconds, reaching an electronically limited top speed of 155 mph (249 km/h).
