= BMW CLAR platform =

Overview
- Manufacturer: BMW
- Production: 2015–present

Body and chassis
- Layout: Front-engine, rear-wheel drive; Front-engine, all-wheel drive (xDrive)

Powertrain
- Engines: I3; I4; I6; V8; V12
- Transmissions: 6-speed manual; 8-speed automatic

The Cluster Architecture (CLAR) platform is a car platform developed by BMW.

It is a modular platform that incorporates steel, aluminium, and optional carbon fibre. It is available with rear-wheel drive or all-wheel drive setups and debuted in the BMW 7 Series (G11) in 2015. It is designed to accommodate a pure ICE drivetrain, has an optional 48-volt electrical system in a mild-hybrid configuration, but also supports plug-in hybrid and battery electric drivetrains.

It was initially called 35up but was later renamed to CLAR. It covers D-segment cars, E-segment cars, F-segment cars, sports cars, SUVs. Smaller BMW cars in the B-segment and C-segment, compact MPV and smaller SUV use the front-wheel drive-based BMW UKL platform instead.

== CLAR LG (Linie Grosse) ==
- BMW 7 Series (G11) (2015–2022)
- BMW 8 Series (G15) (2018–2026)
- BMW M8 (F91/F92/F93) (2019–2025)
- BMW X5 (G05) (2018–present)
- BMW X6 (G06) (2019–present)
- BMW X7 (G07) (2019–present)
- BMW XM (G09) (2022–present)
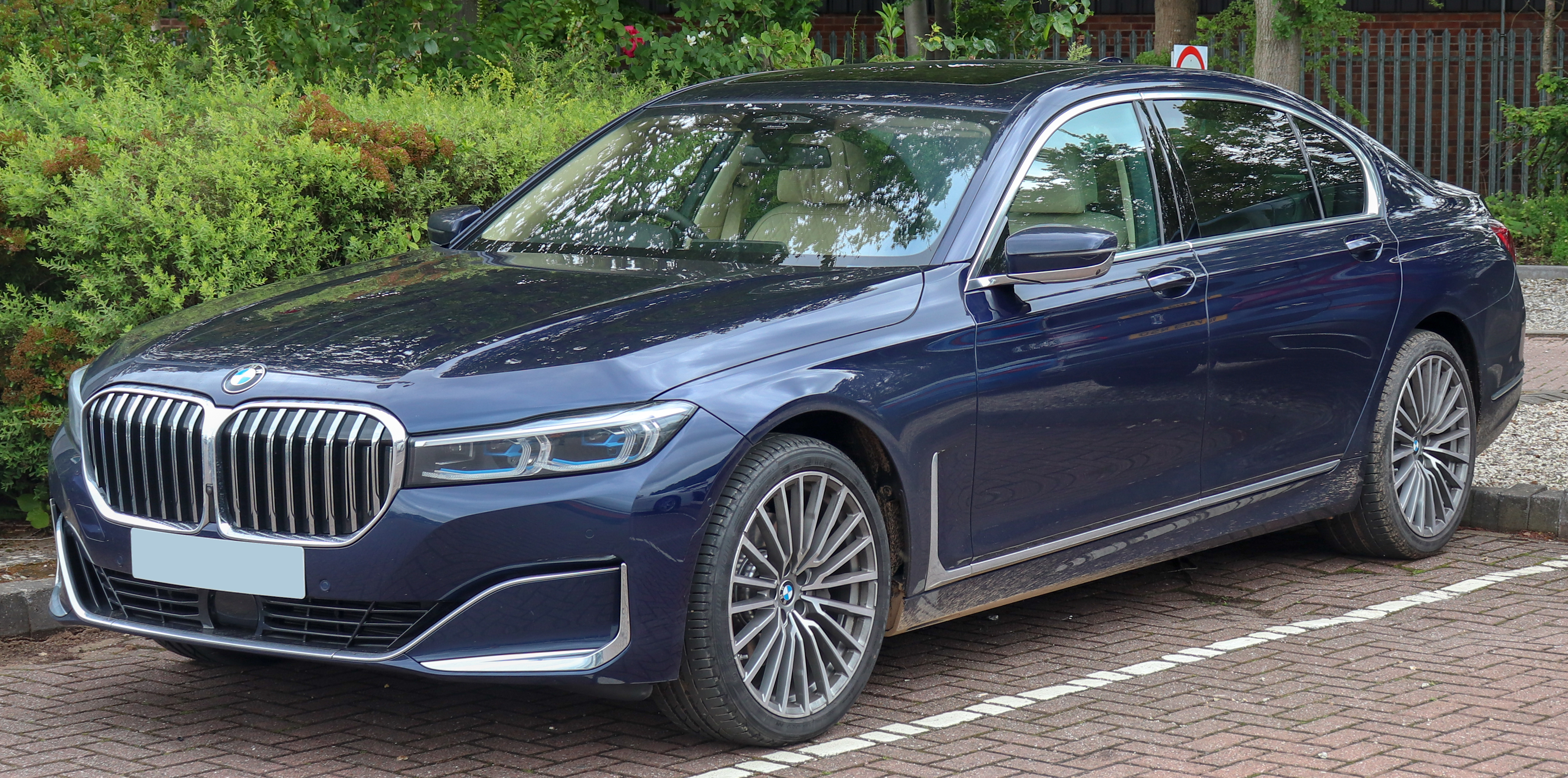
BMW 7 Series (G11)

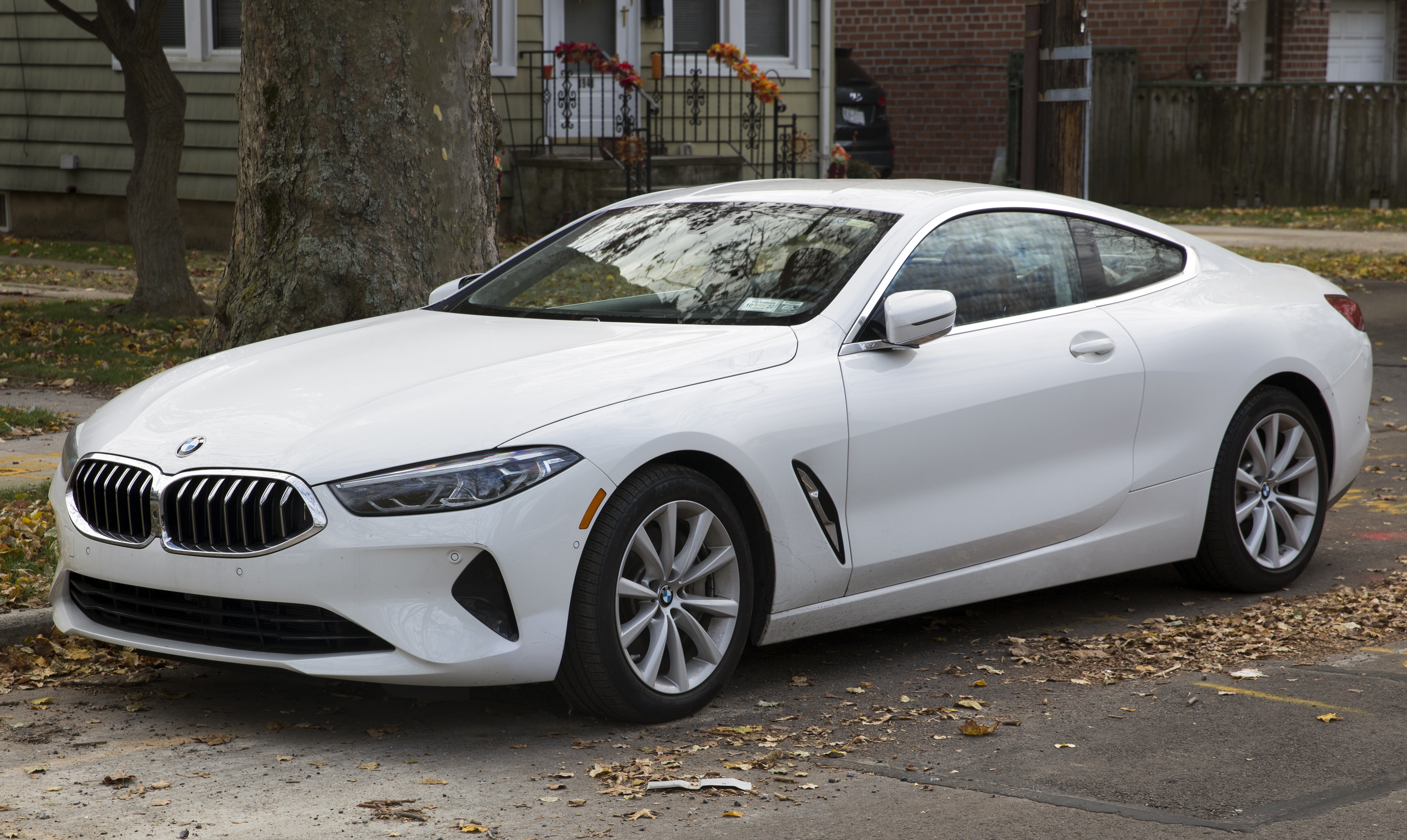
BMW 8 Series (G15)

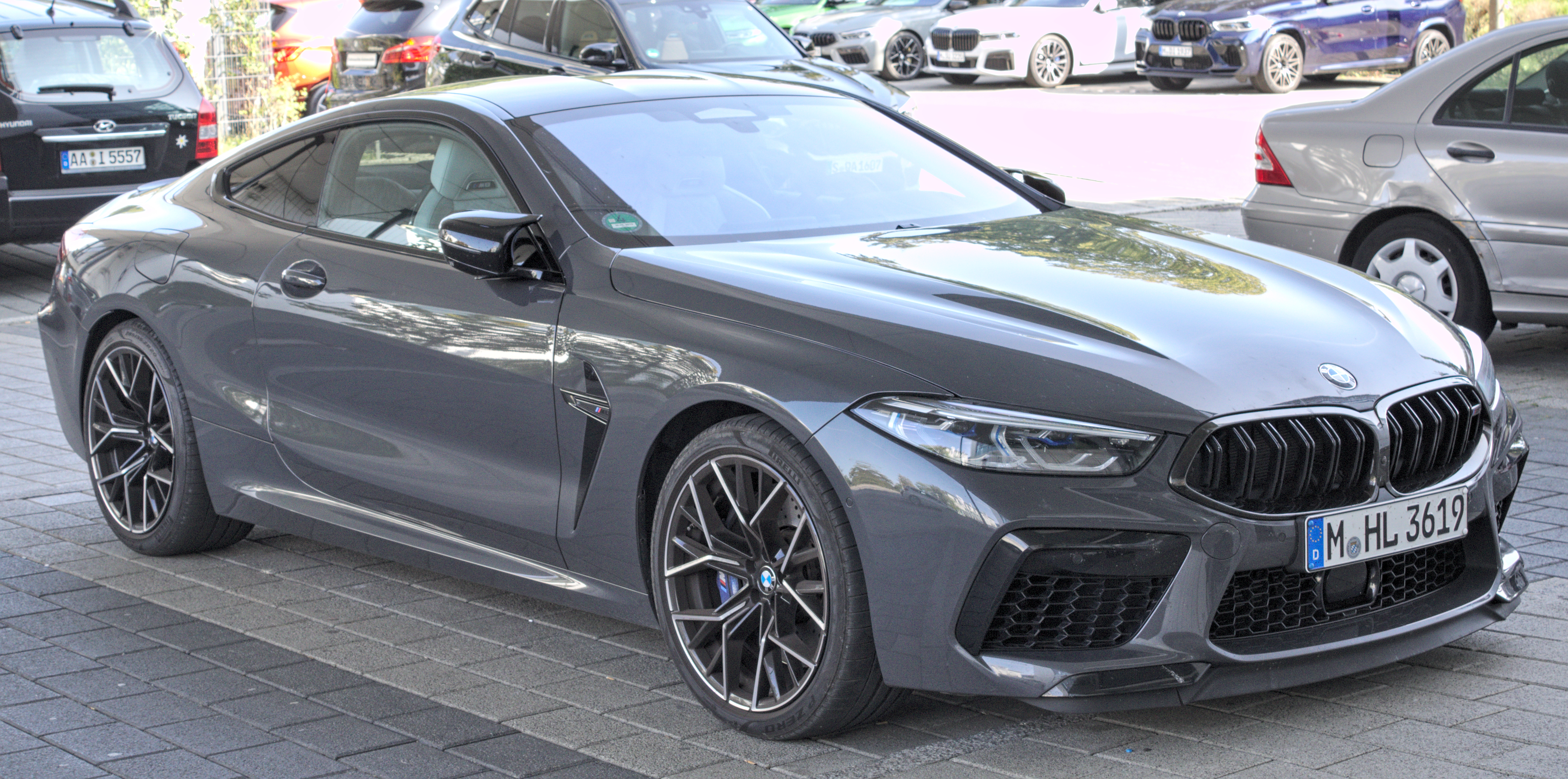
BMW M8 (F91/F92/F93)

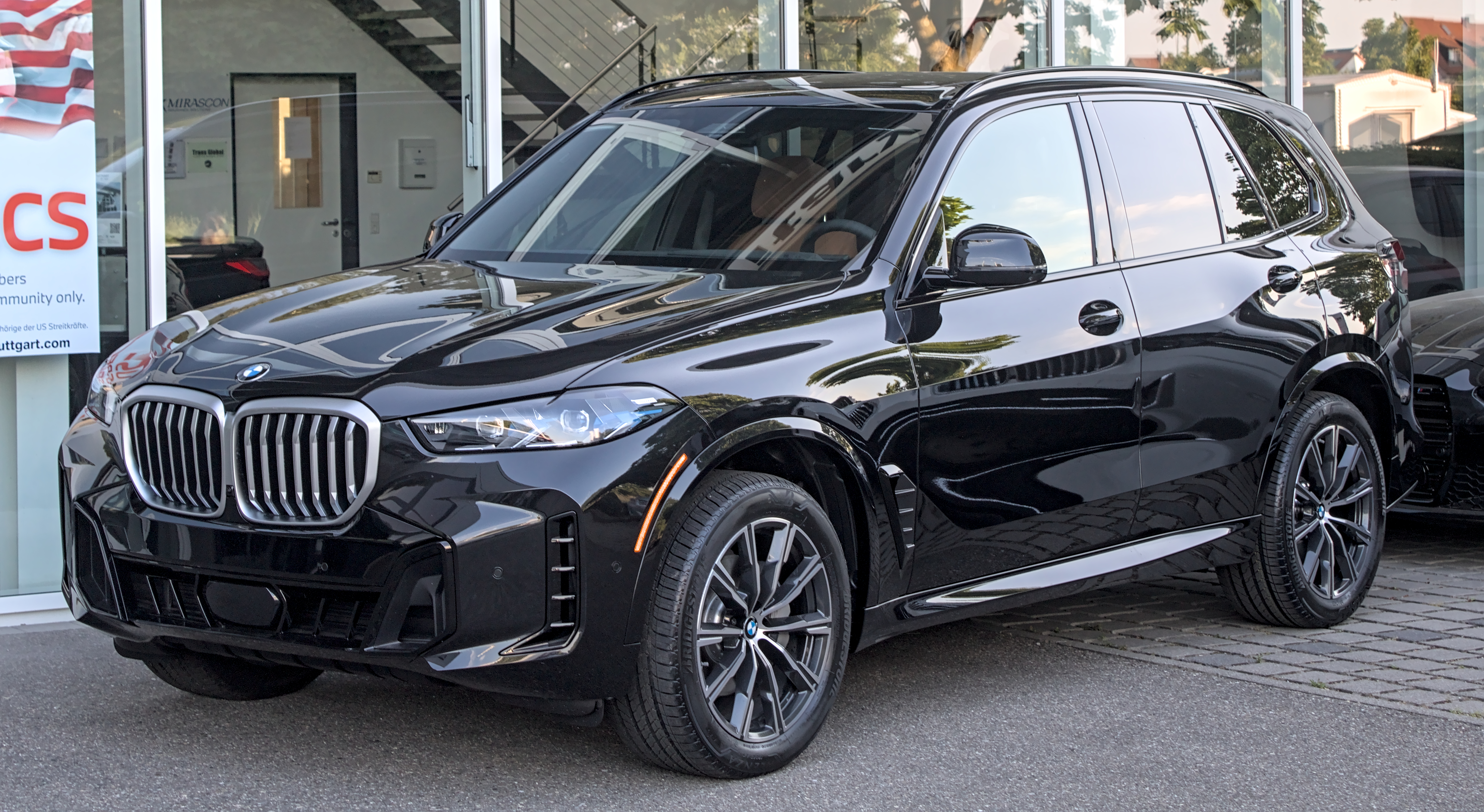
BMW X5 (G05)

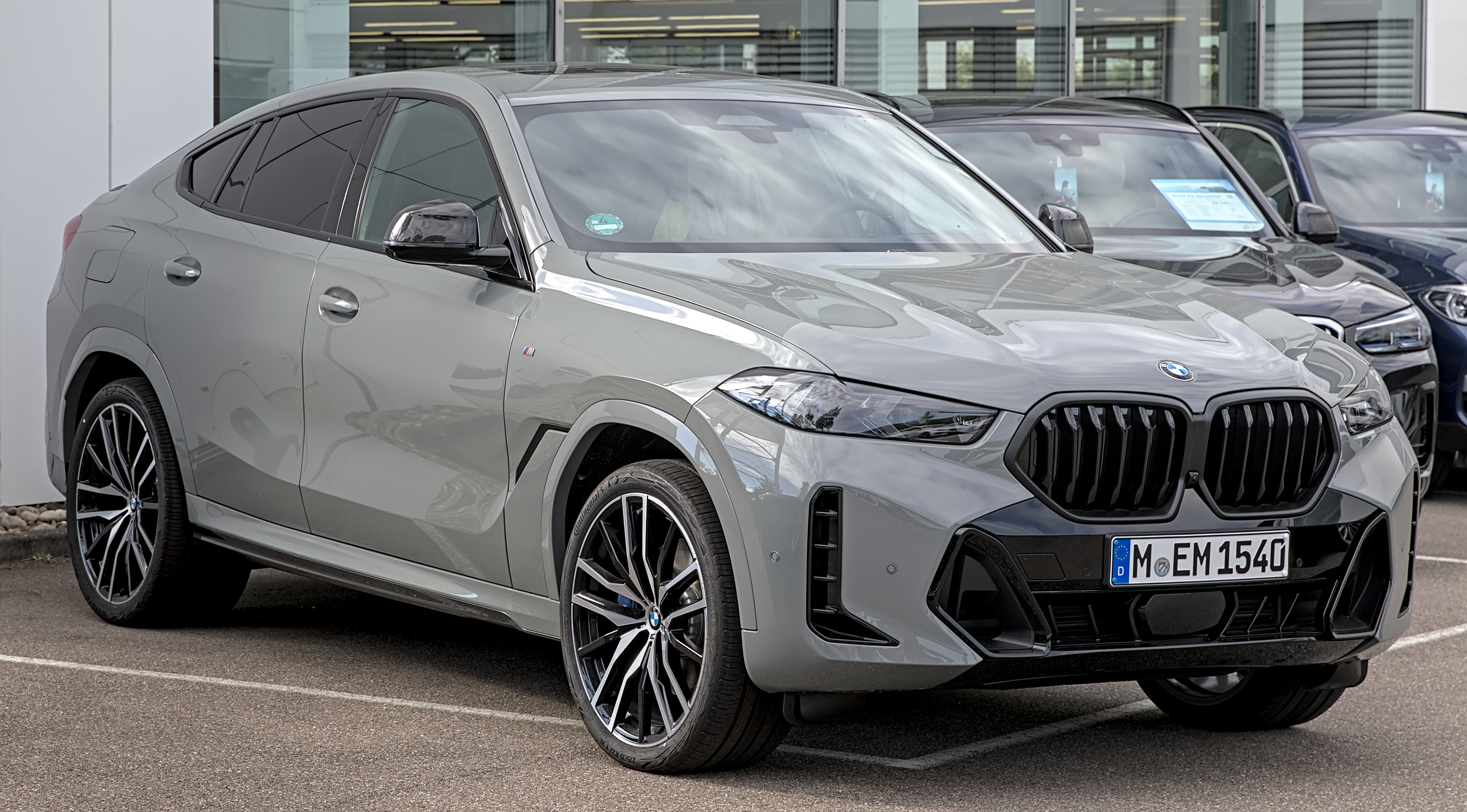
BMW X6 (G06)

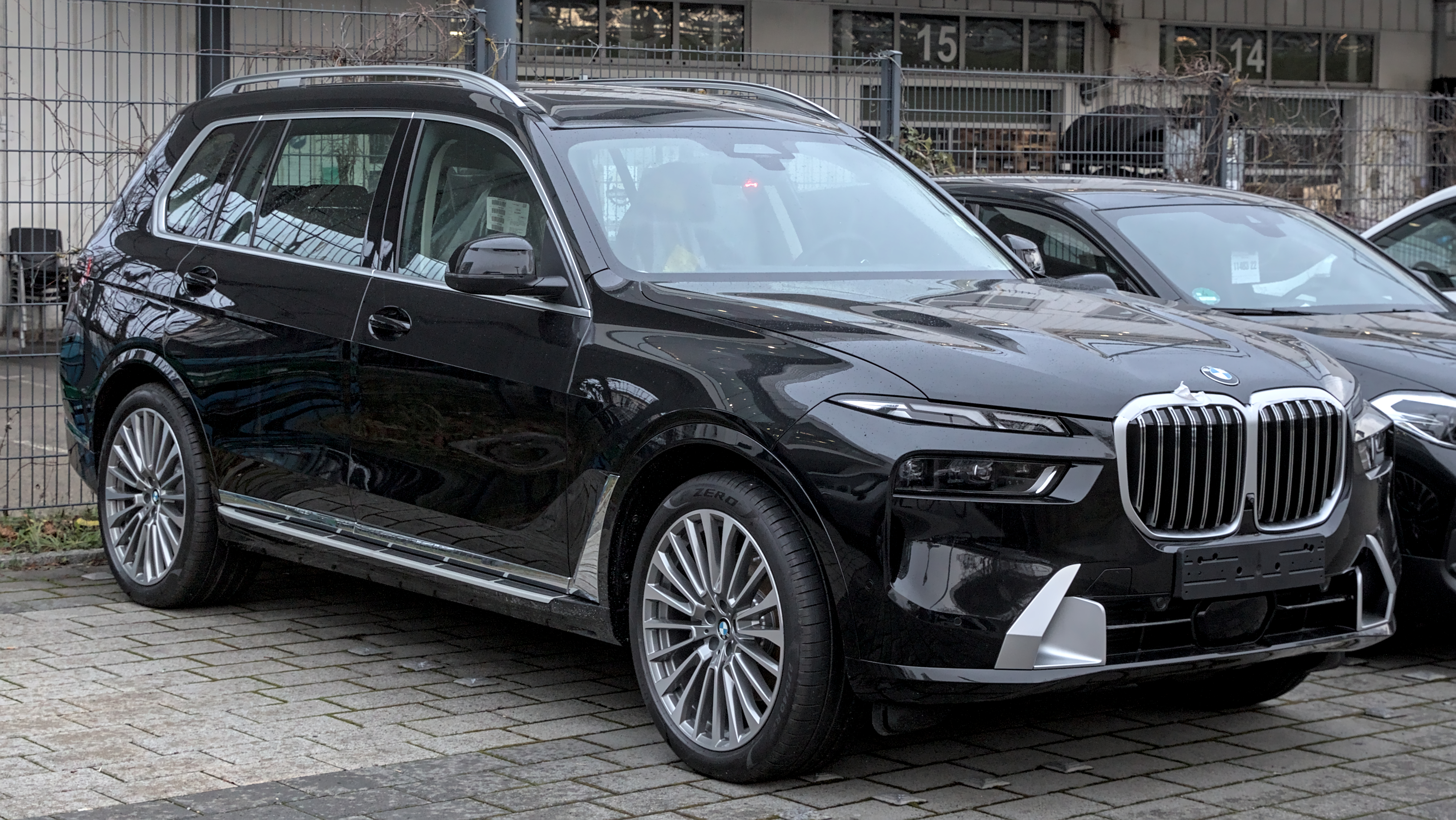
BMW X7 (G07)

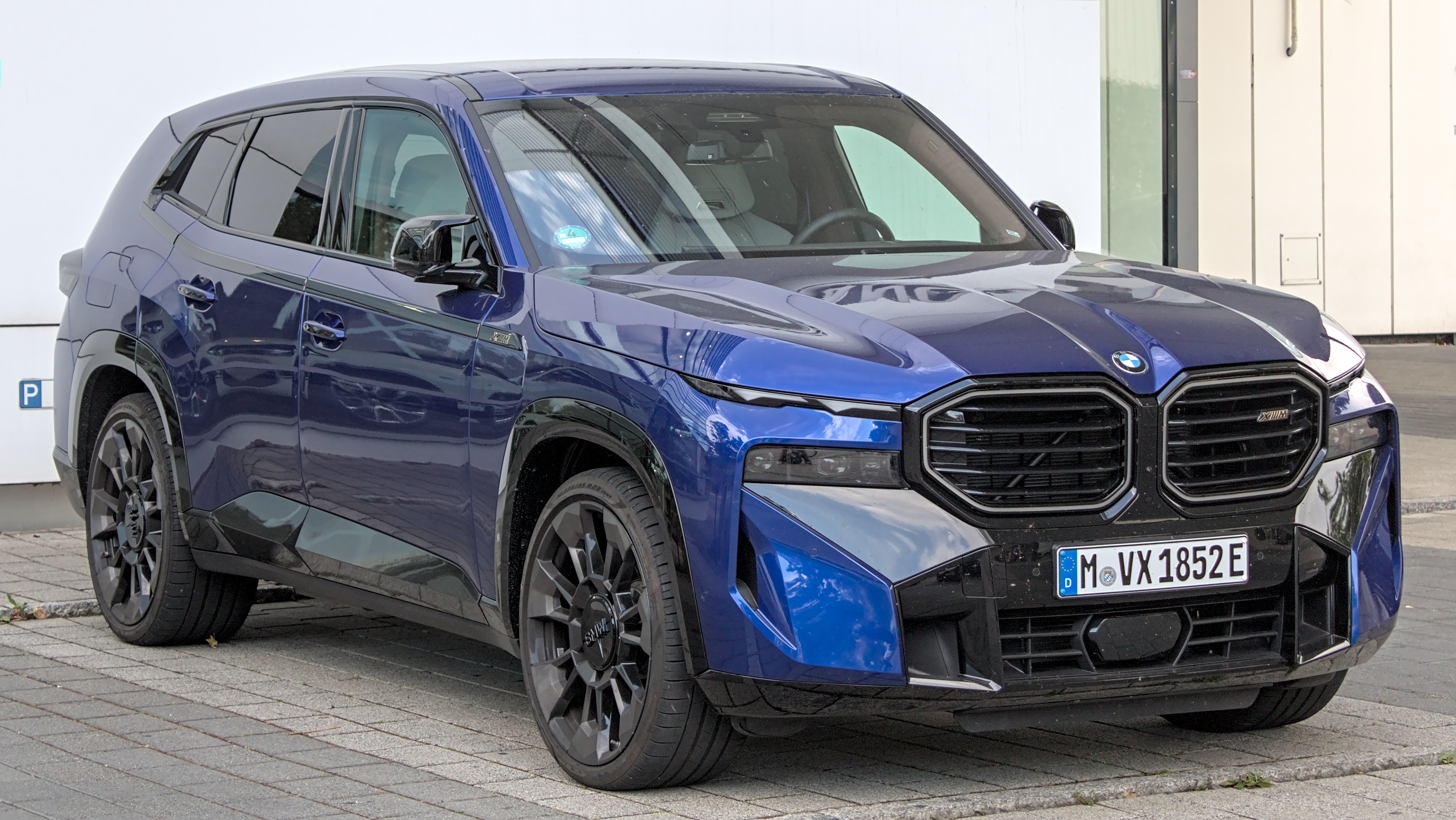
BMW XM (G09)

== CLAR LK (Linie Klein) ==
- BMW 5 Series (G30) (2016–2023)
- BMW M5 (F90) (2017–2023)
- BMW 6 Series (G32) (2017–2023)
- BMW X3 (G01) (2017–2024)
- BMW X4 (G02) (2018–2025)
- BMW iX3 (G08) (2018–2024)
- BMW Z4 (G29) (2018–2026)
- BMW 3 Series (G20/G21) (2018–present)
- BMW M3 (G80/G81) (2020–present)
- Toyota GR Supra (J29/DB) (2019–2026)
- BMW 4 Series (G22/G23/G26) (2020–present)
- BMW M4 (G82/G83) (2020–present)
- BMW 2 Series (G42) (2021–present)
- BMW M2 (G87) (2023–present)
- Boldmen CR4 (2022–present)
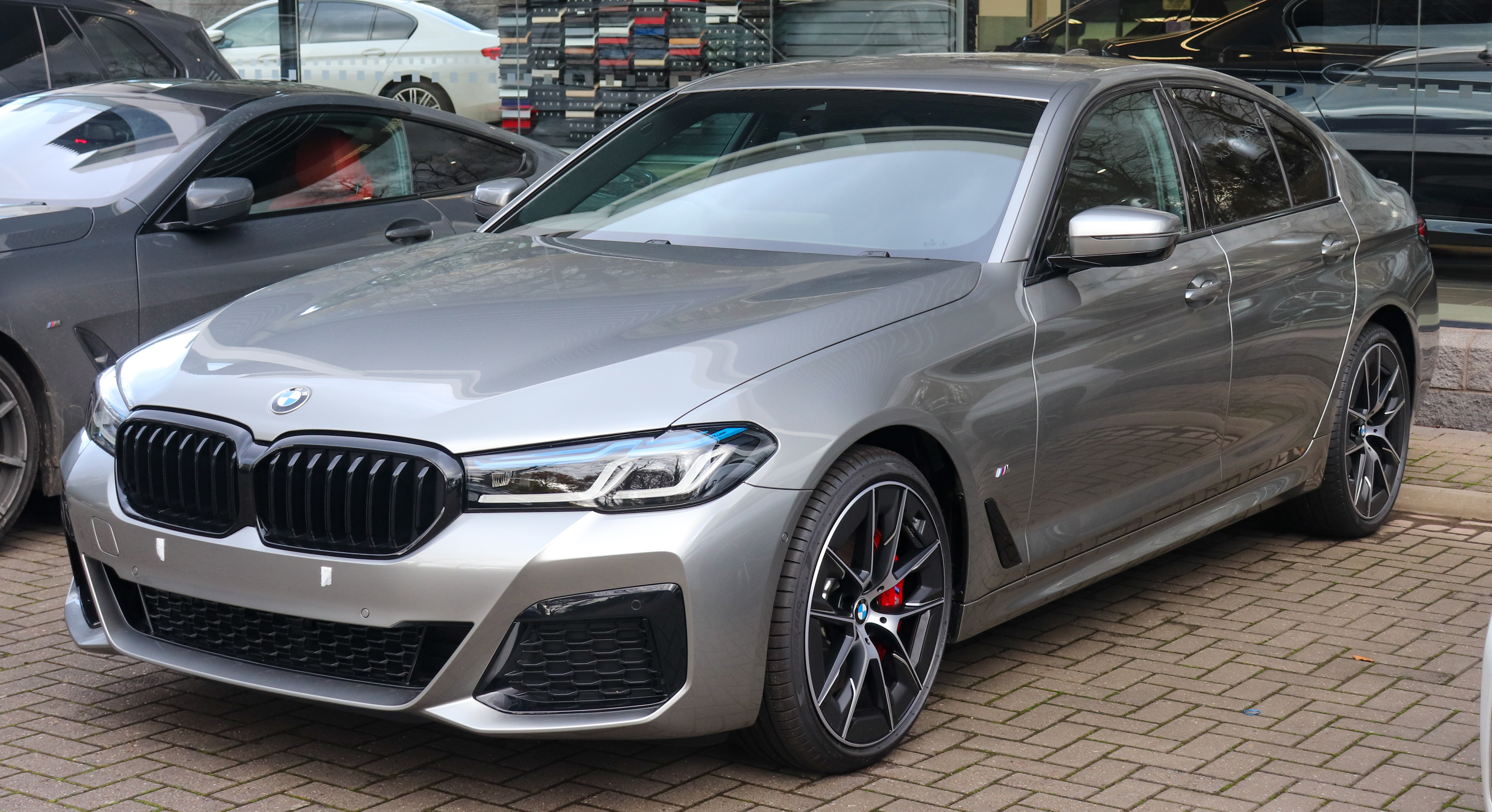
BMW 5 Series (G30)

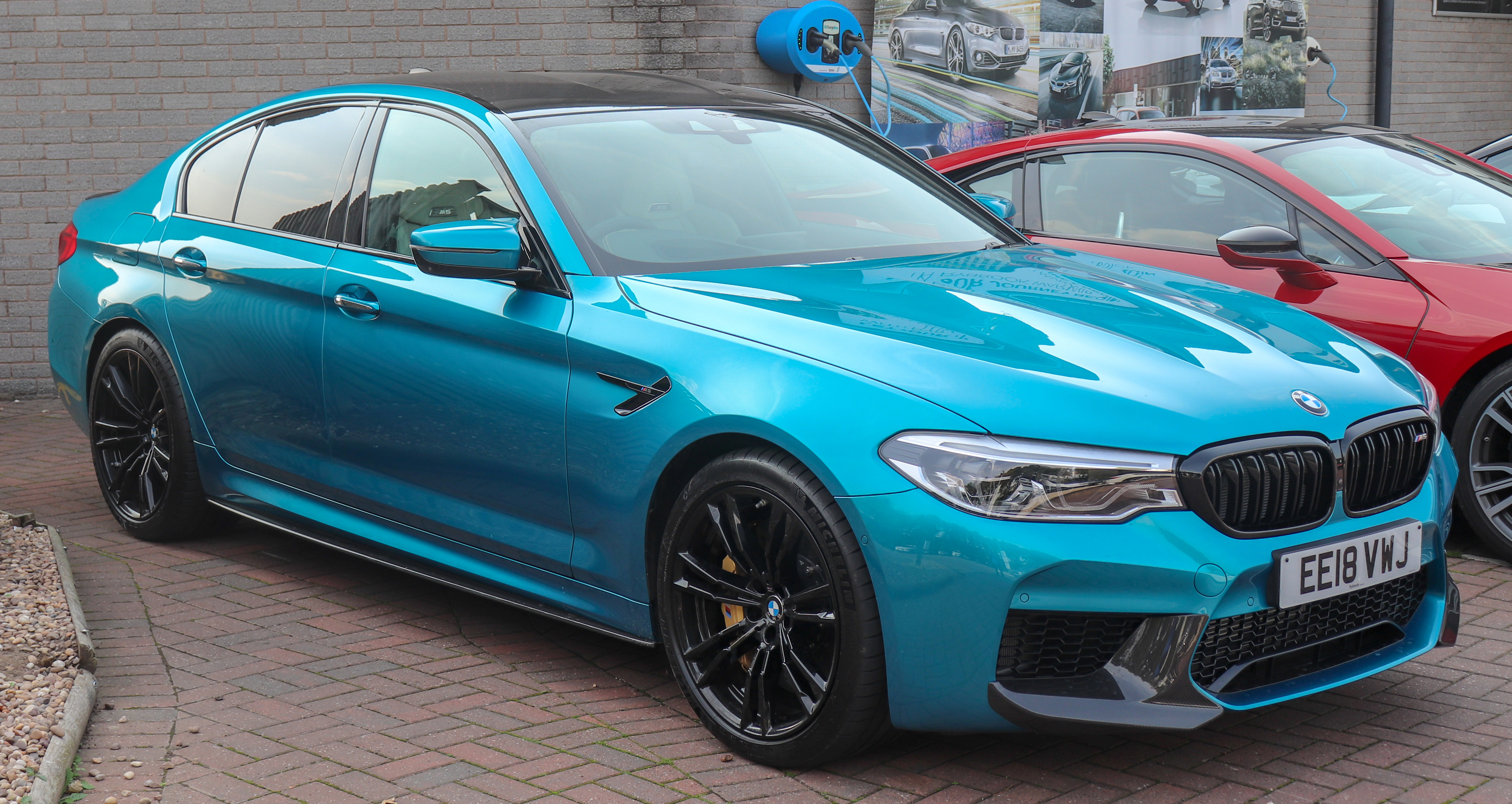
BMW M5 (F90)

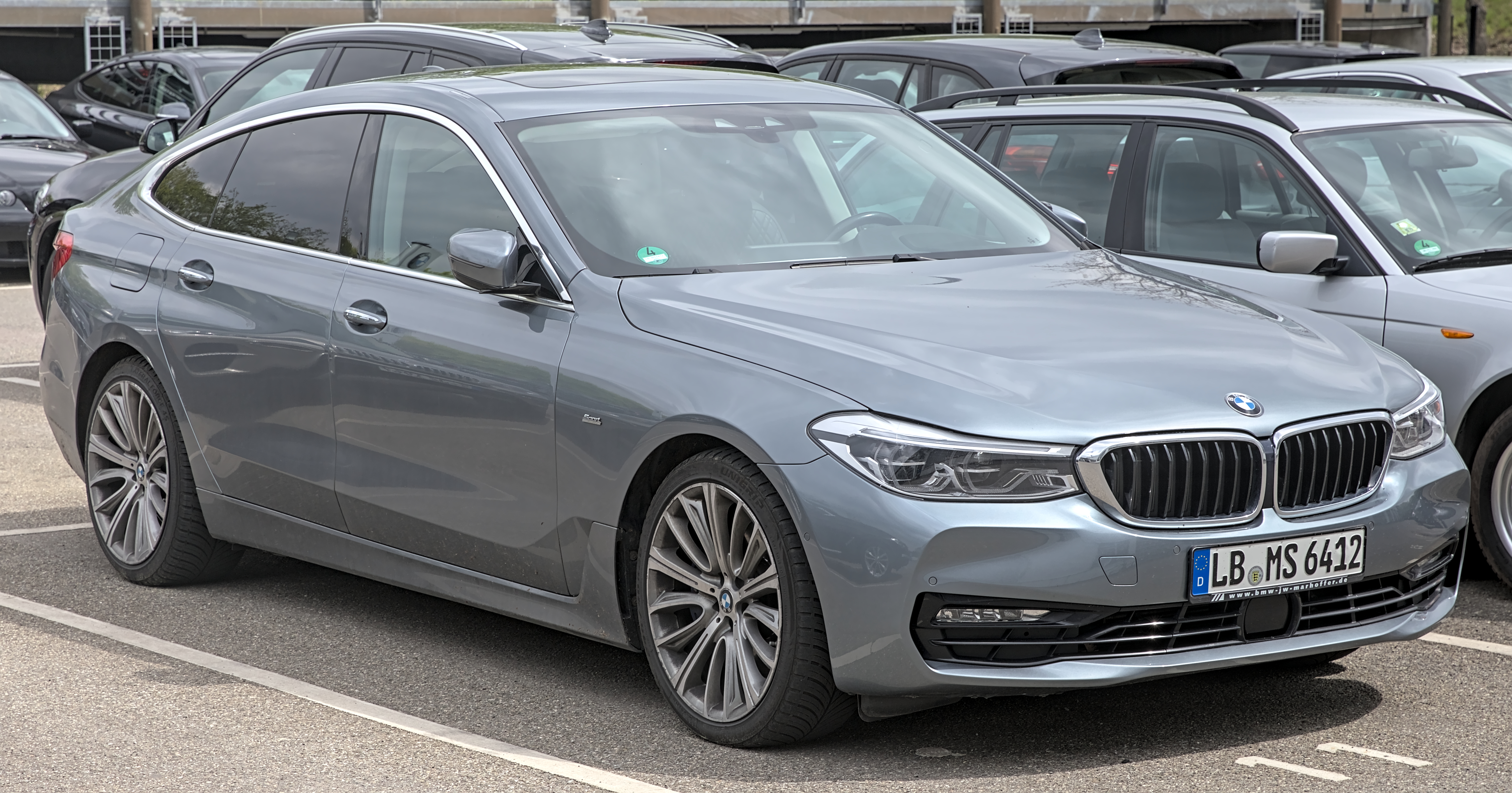
BMW 6 Series (G32)

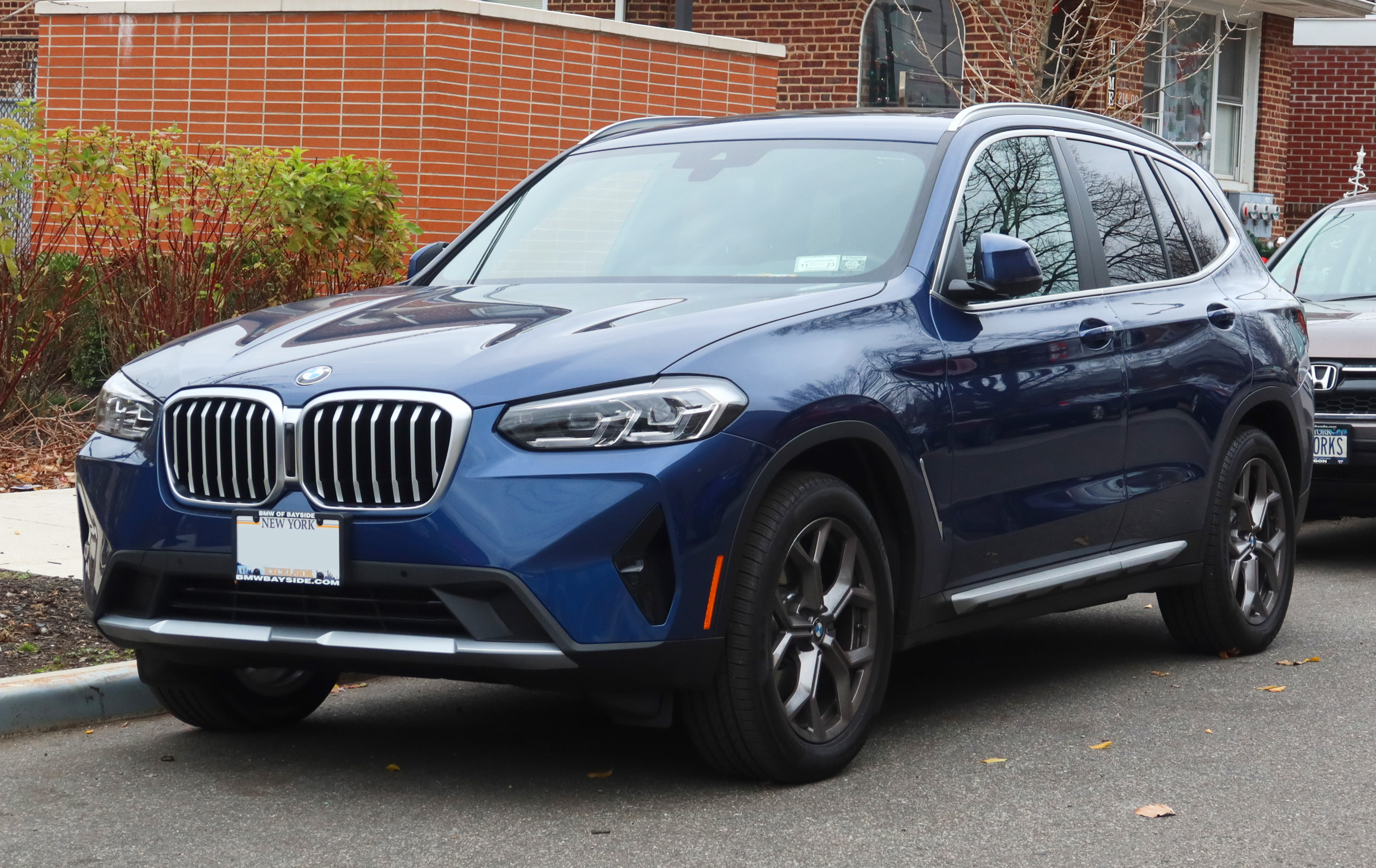
BMW X3 (G01)

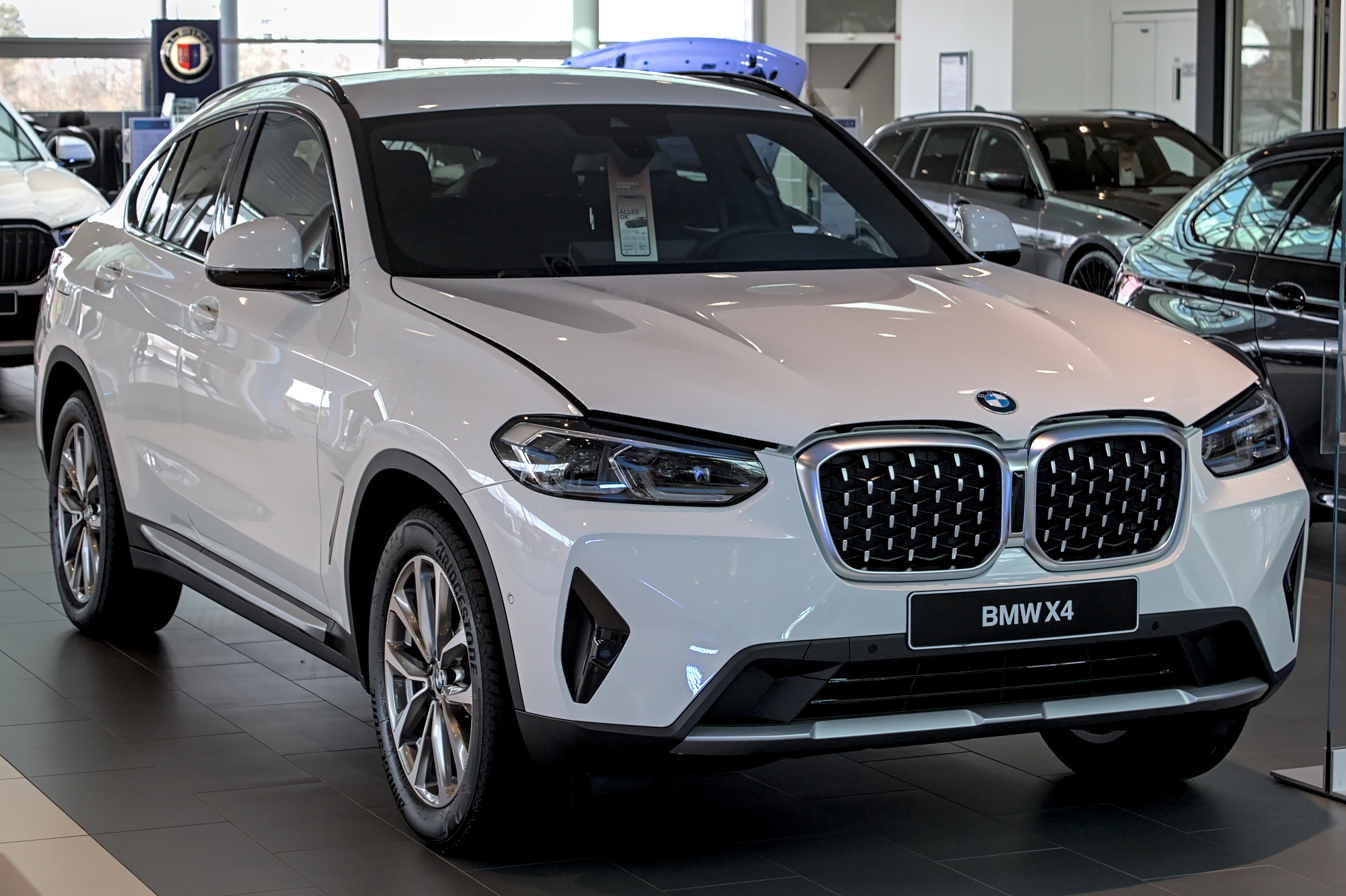
BMW X4 (G02)

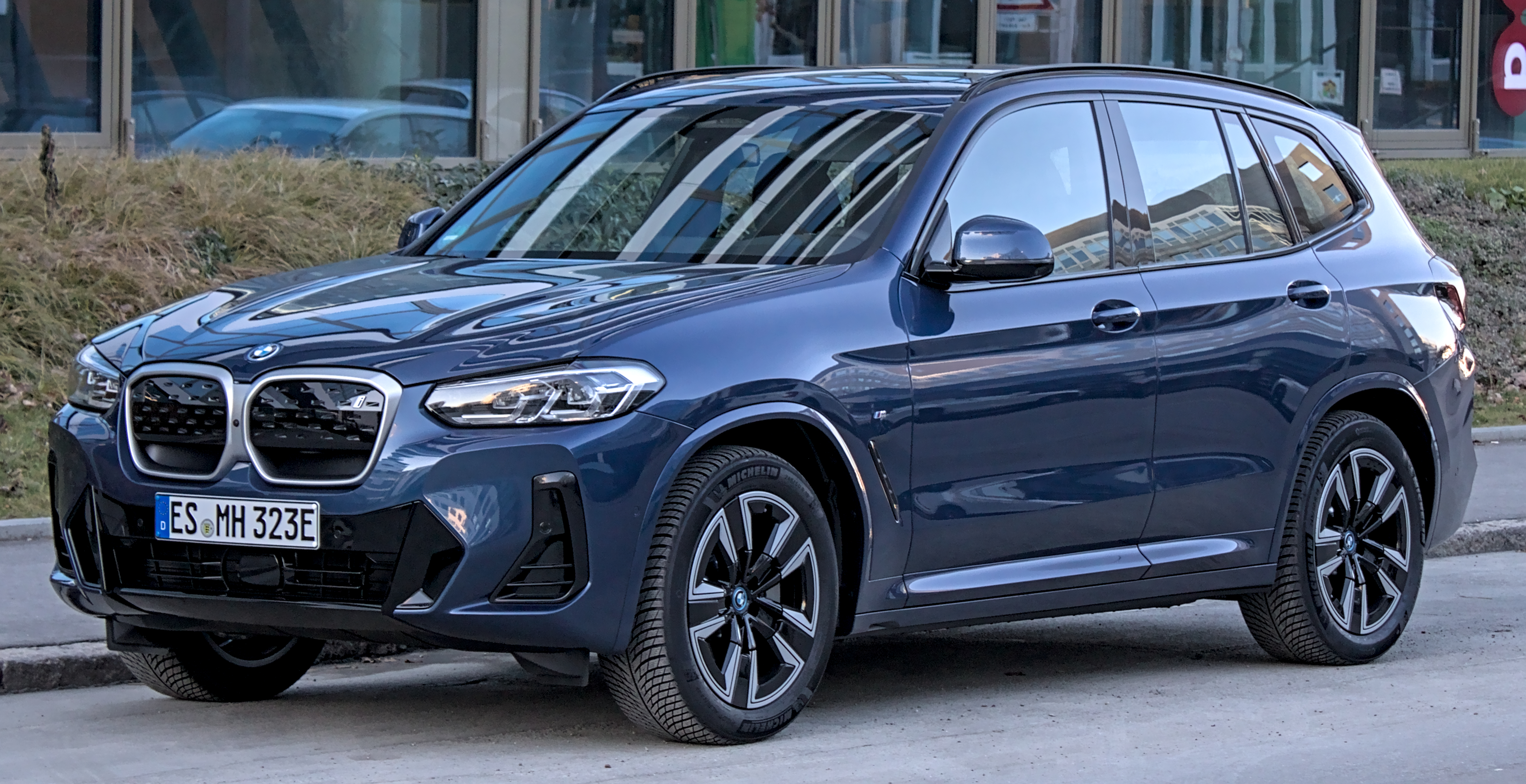
BMW iX3 (G08)

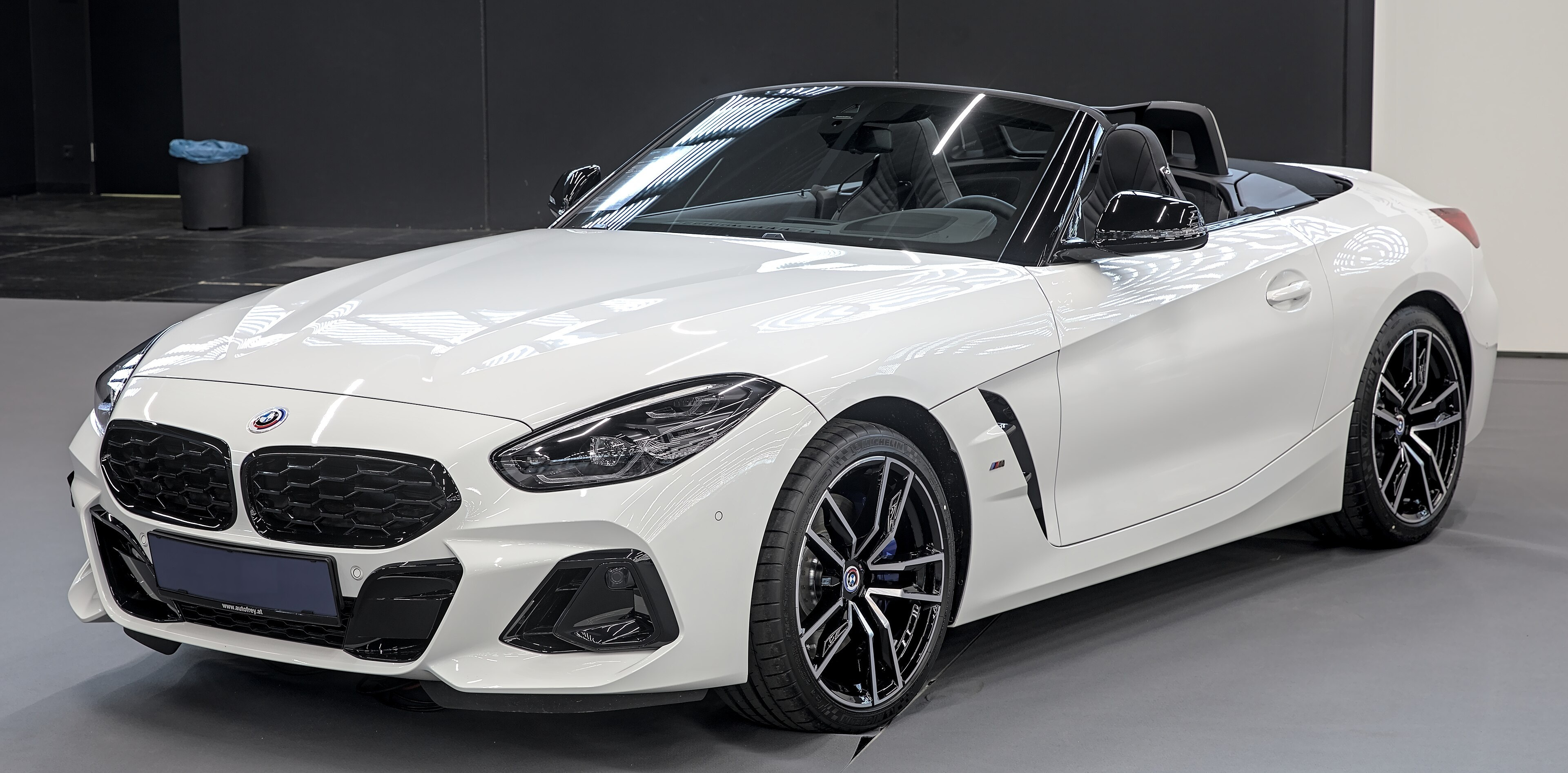
BMW Z4 (G29)

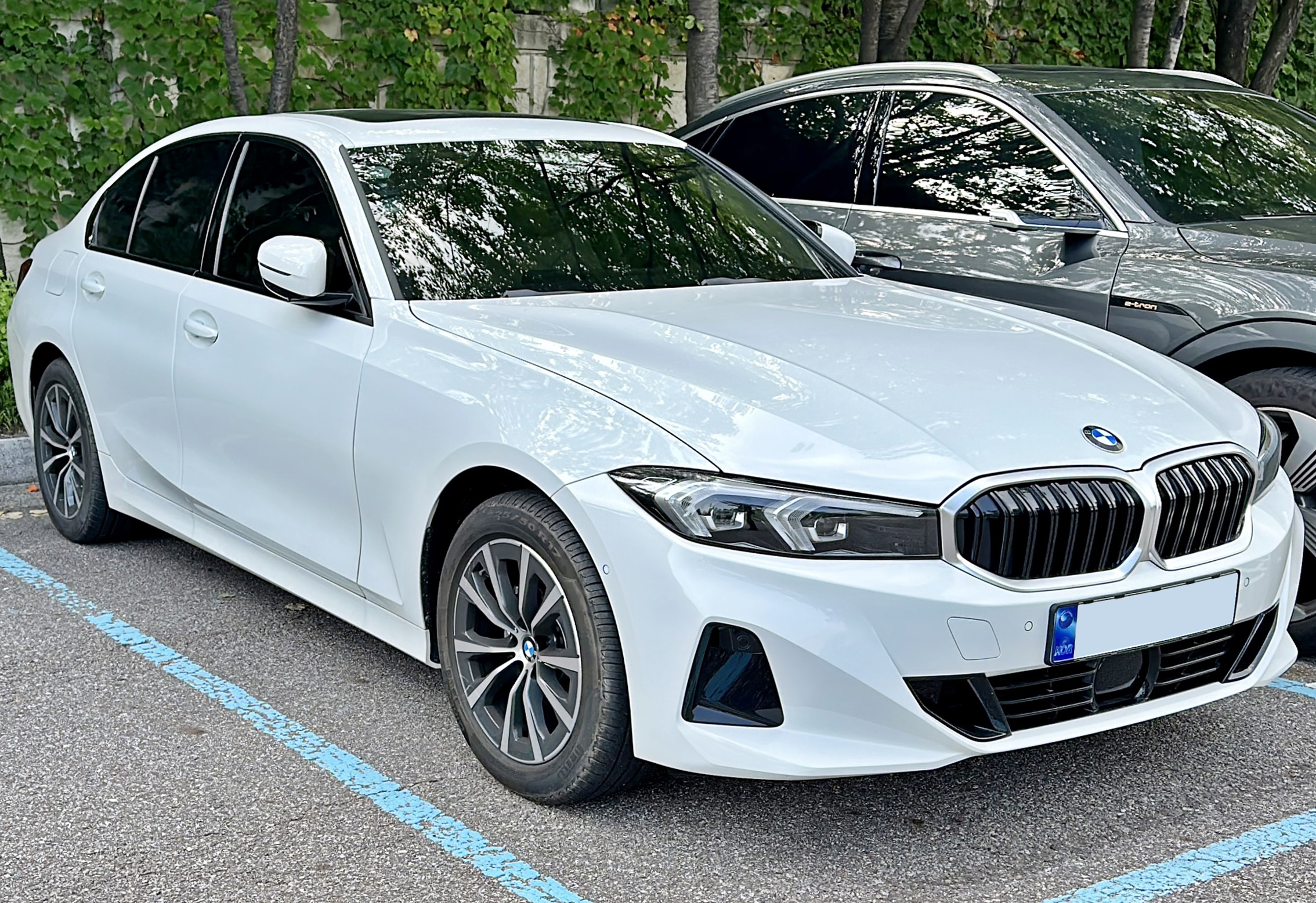
BMW 3 Series (G20)

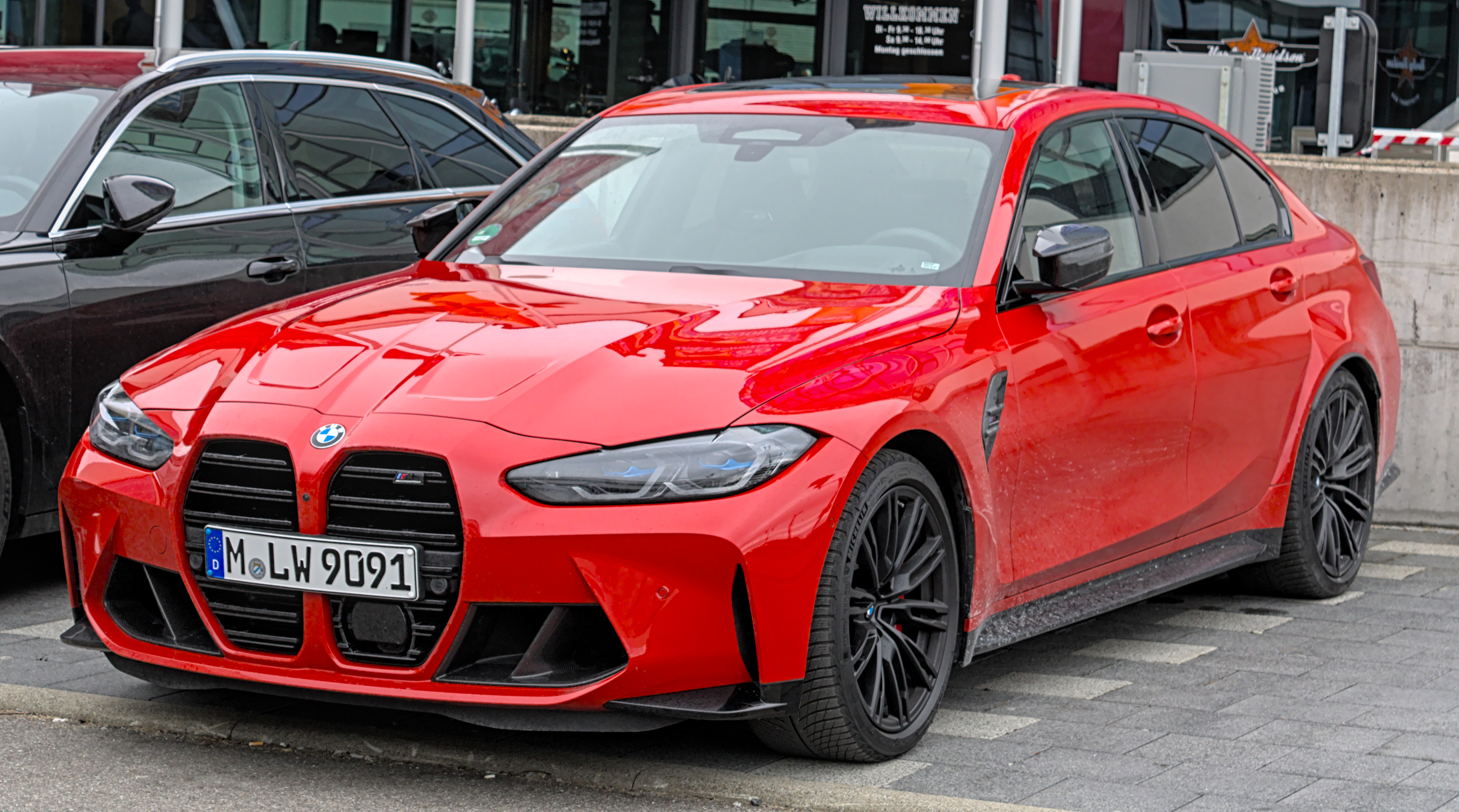
BMW M3 (G80/G81)

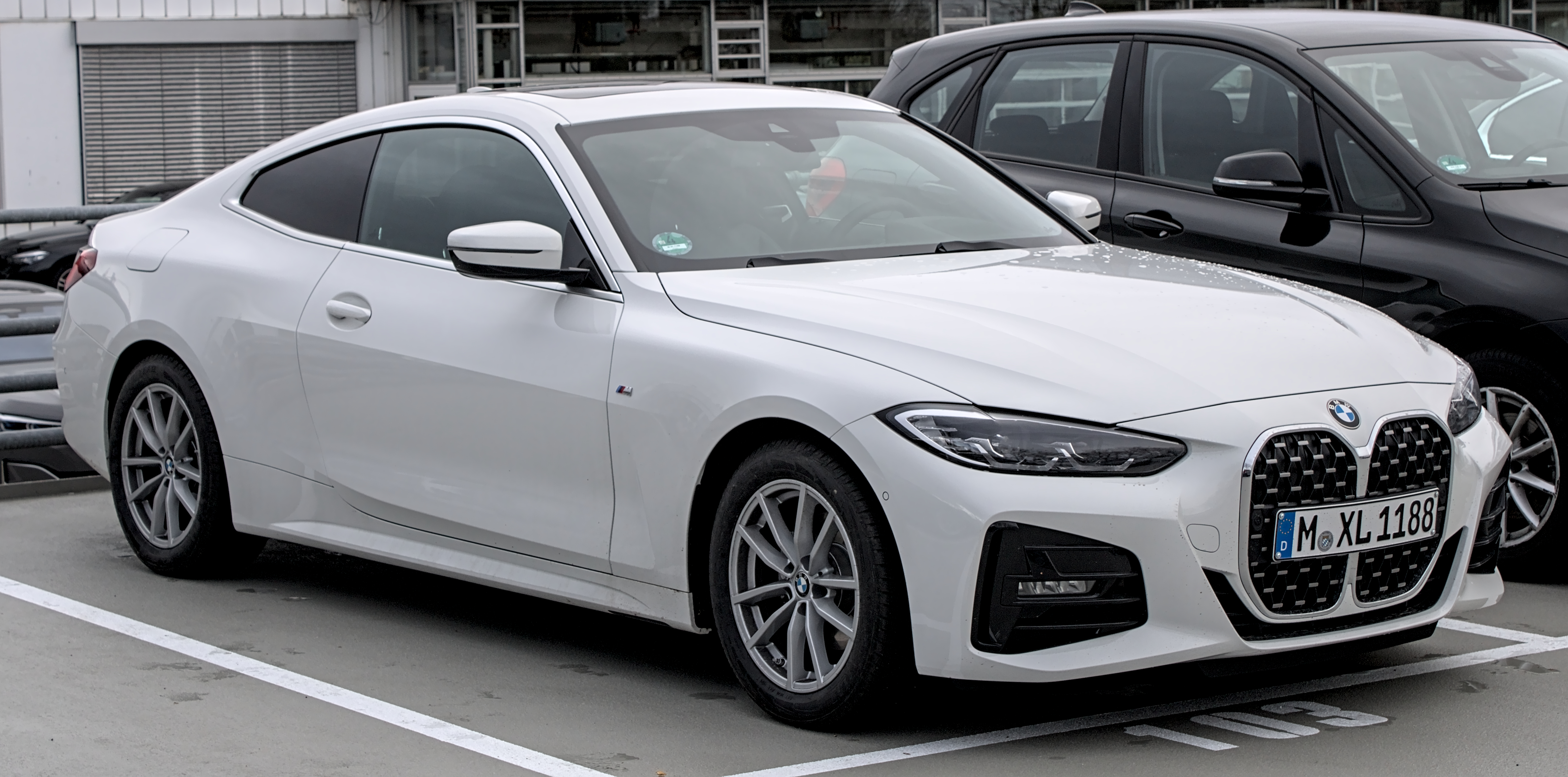
BMW 4 Series (G22/G23/G26)

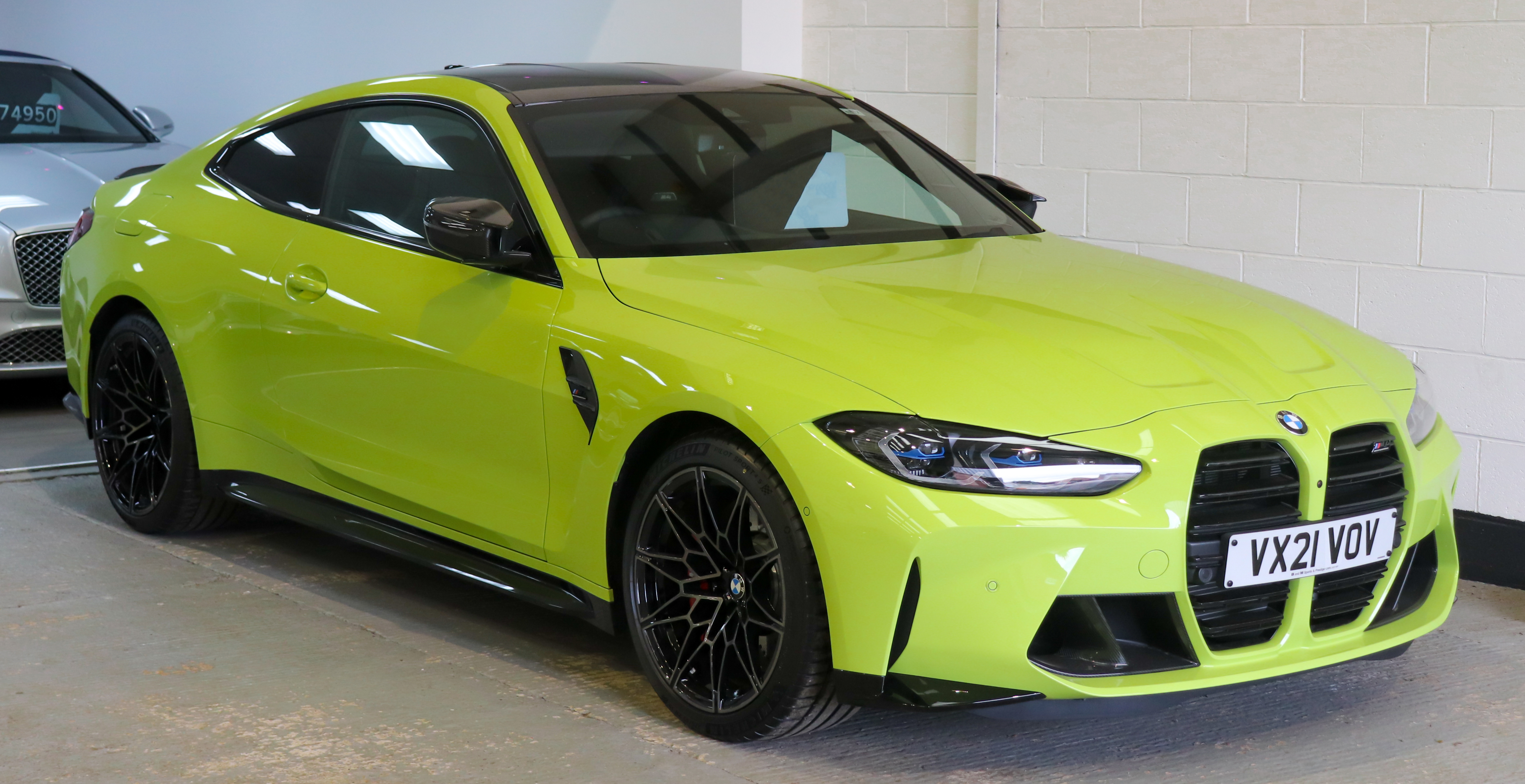
BMW M4 (G82/G83)

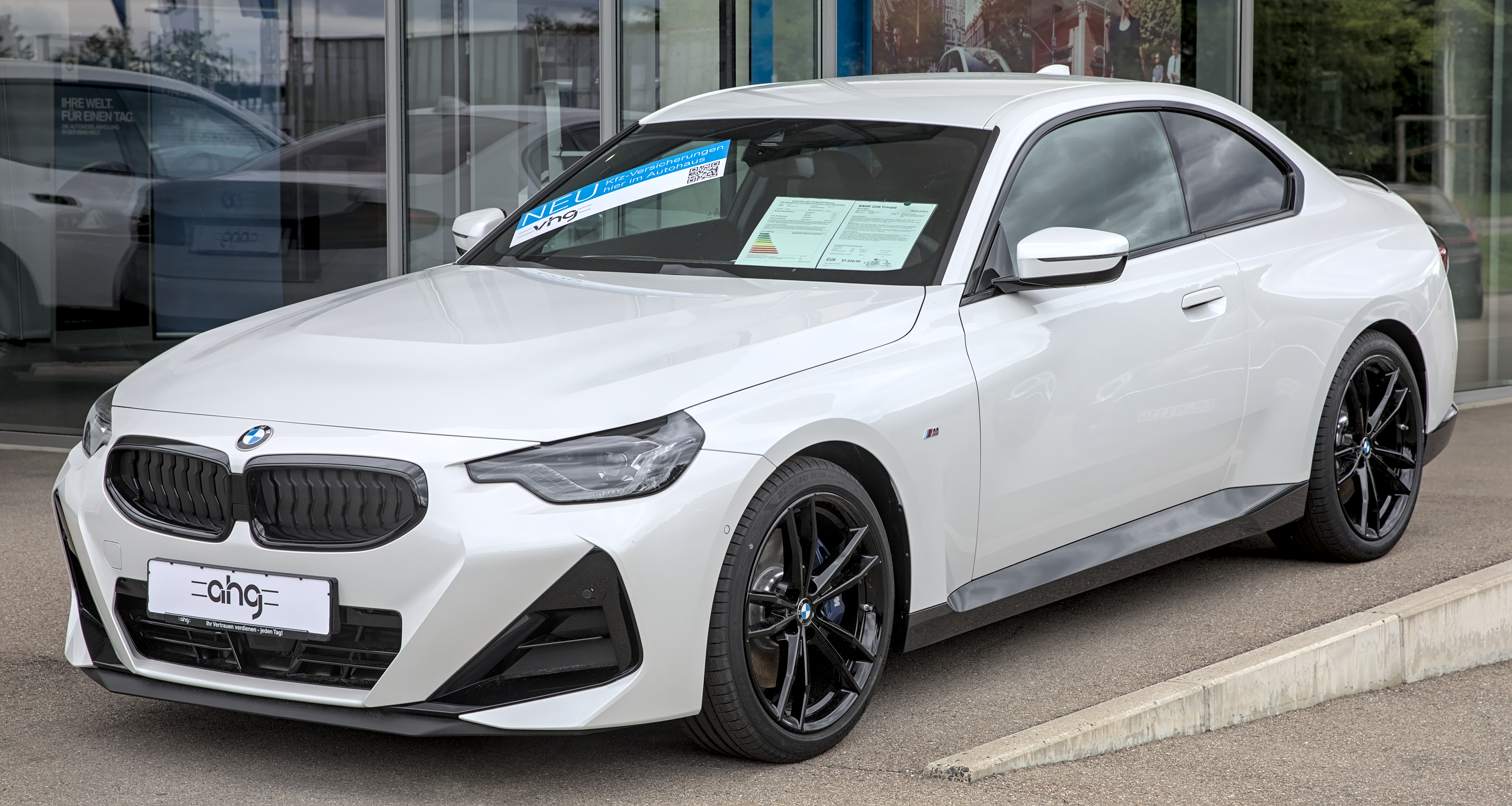
BMW 2 Series (G42)

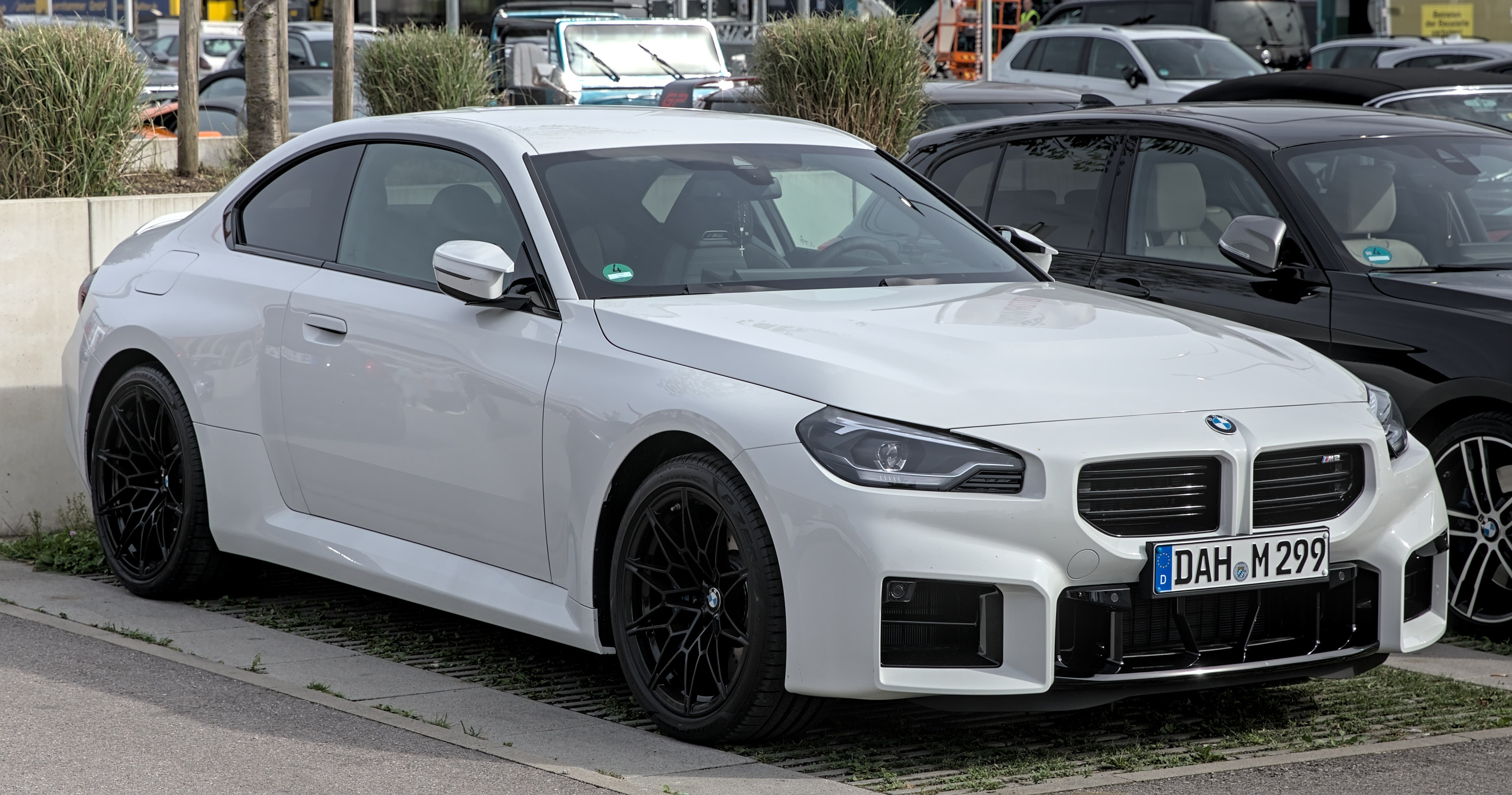
BMW M2 (G87)

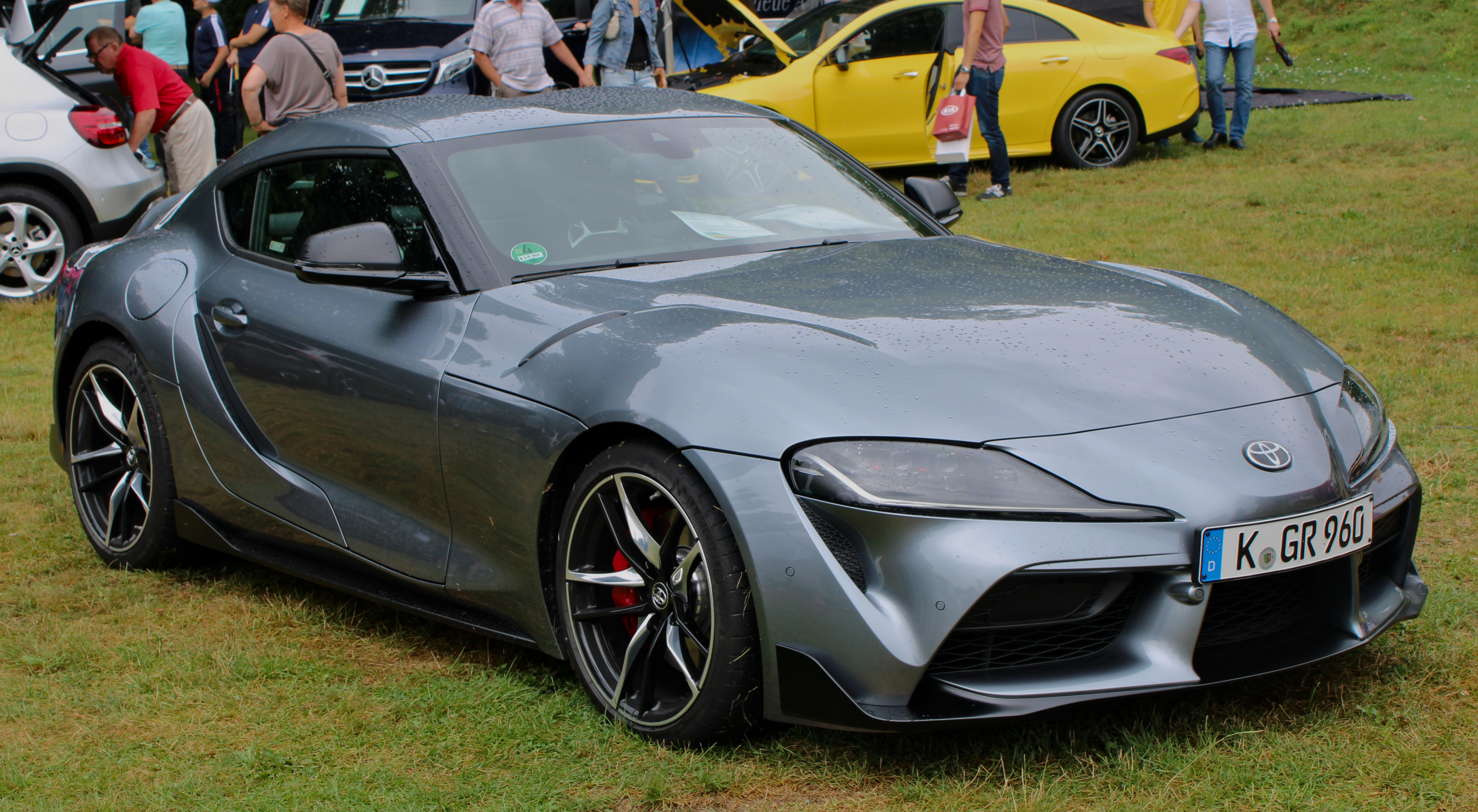
Toyota GR Supra

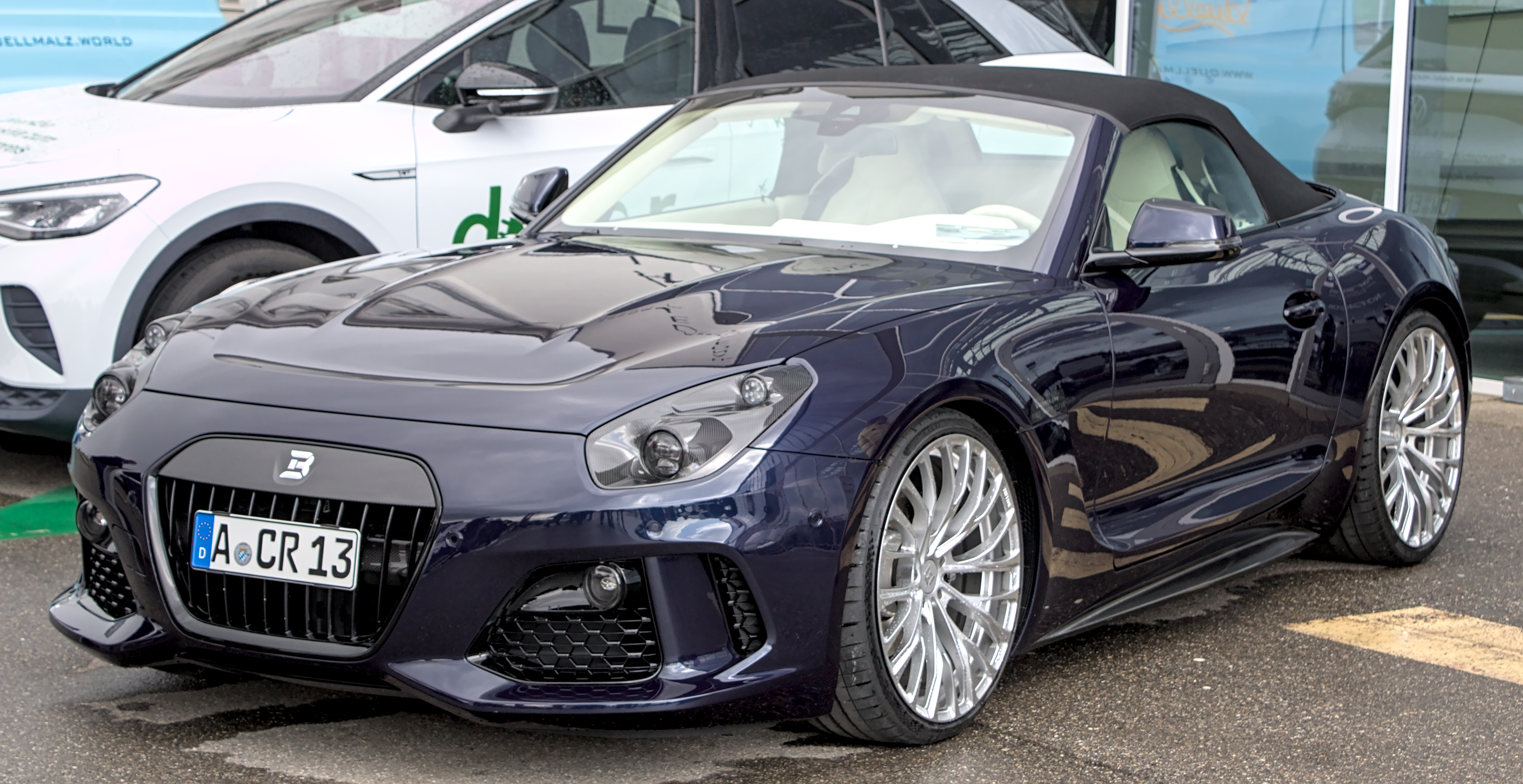
Boldmen CR4

== CLAR II (CLAR-WE) ==
- BMW iX (I20) (2021–present)
- BMW 7 Series (G70) (2022–present)
- BMW 5 Series (G60) (2023–present)
- BMW M5 (G90) (2024–present)
- BMW X3 (G45) (2024–present)
- BMW 3 Series (G50) (2026, in development)
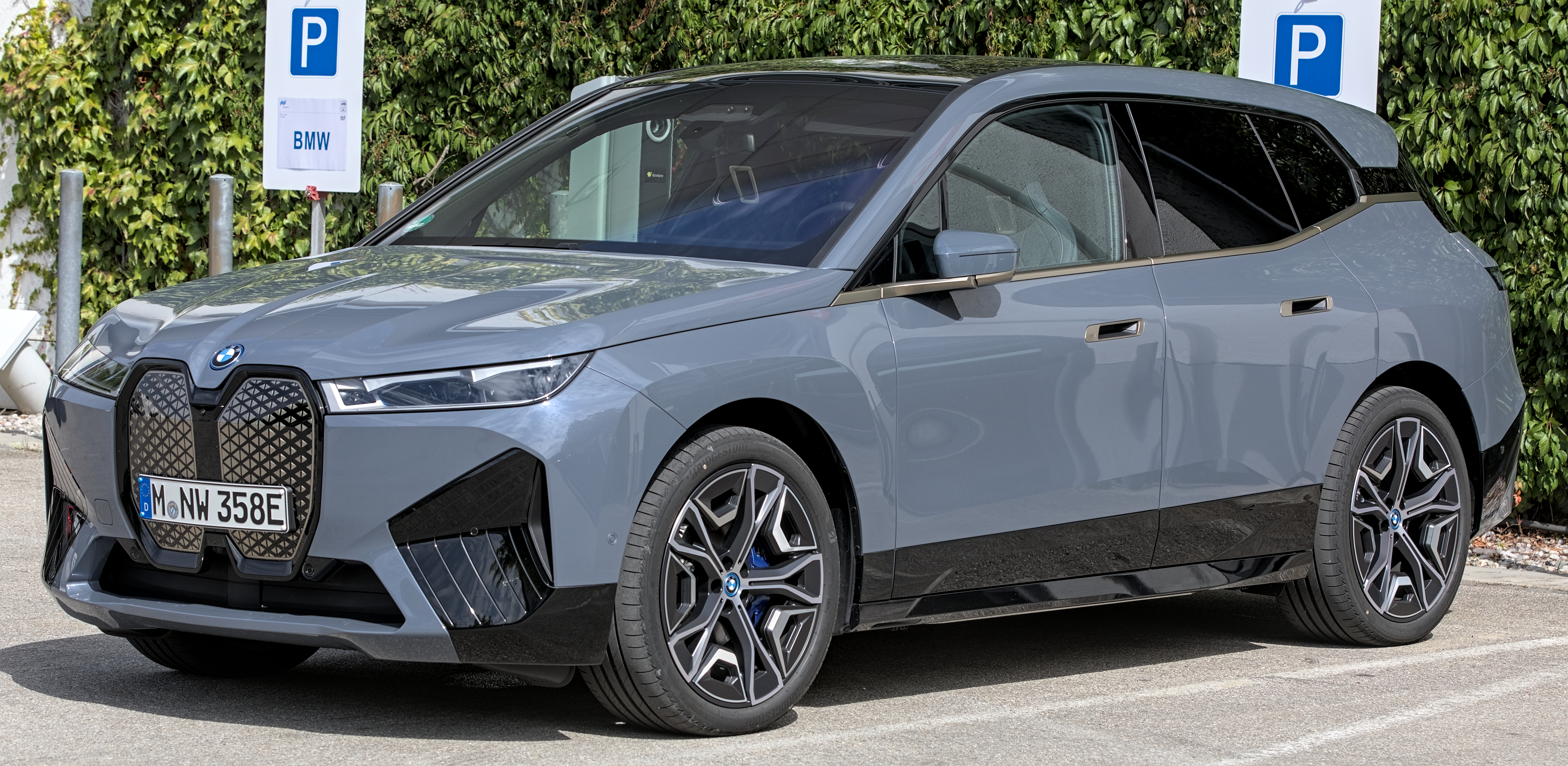
BMW iX (I20)

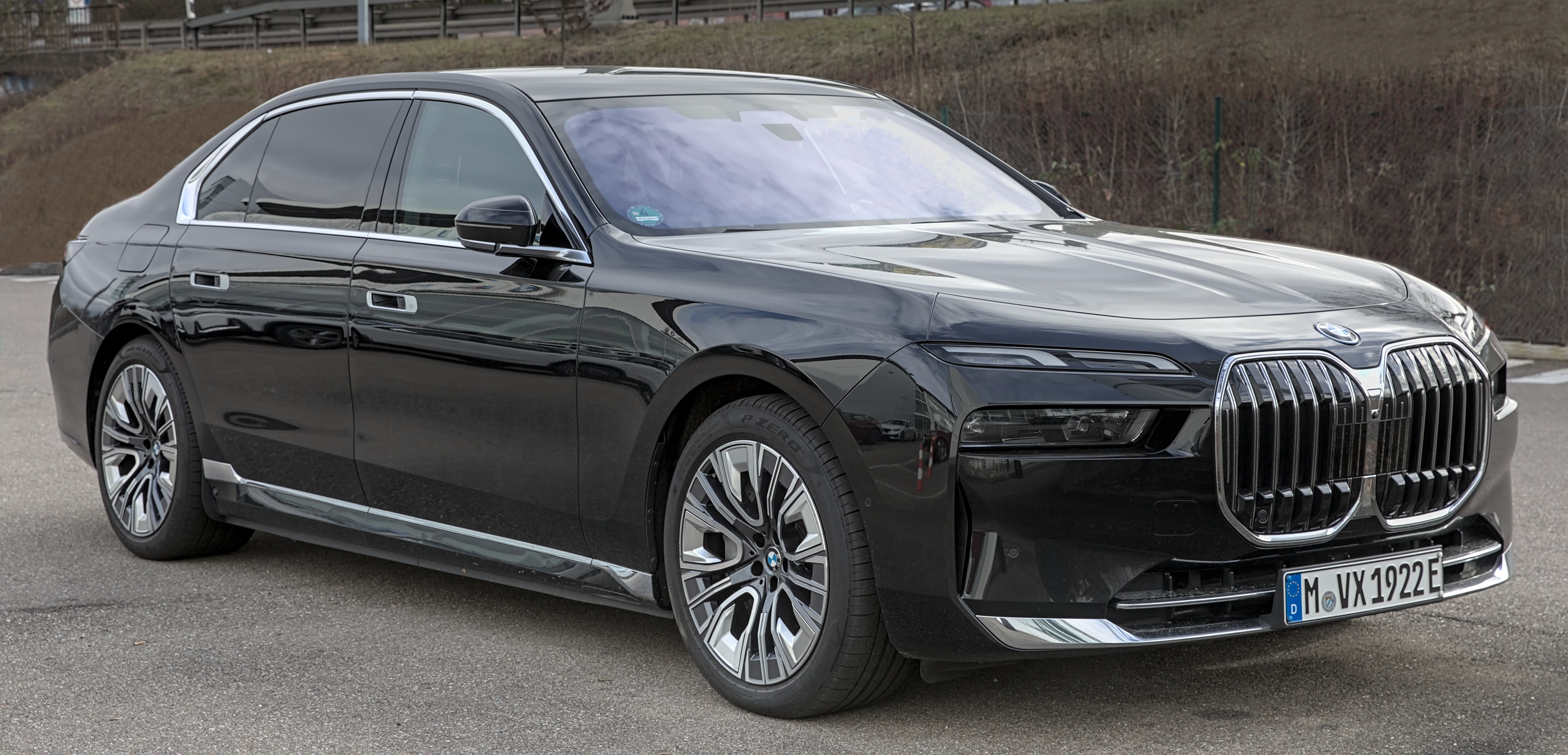
BMW 7 Series (G70)

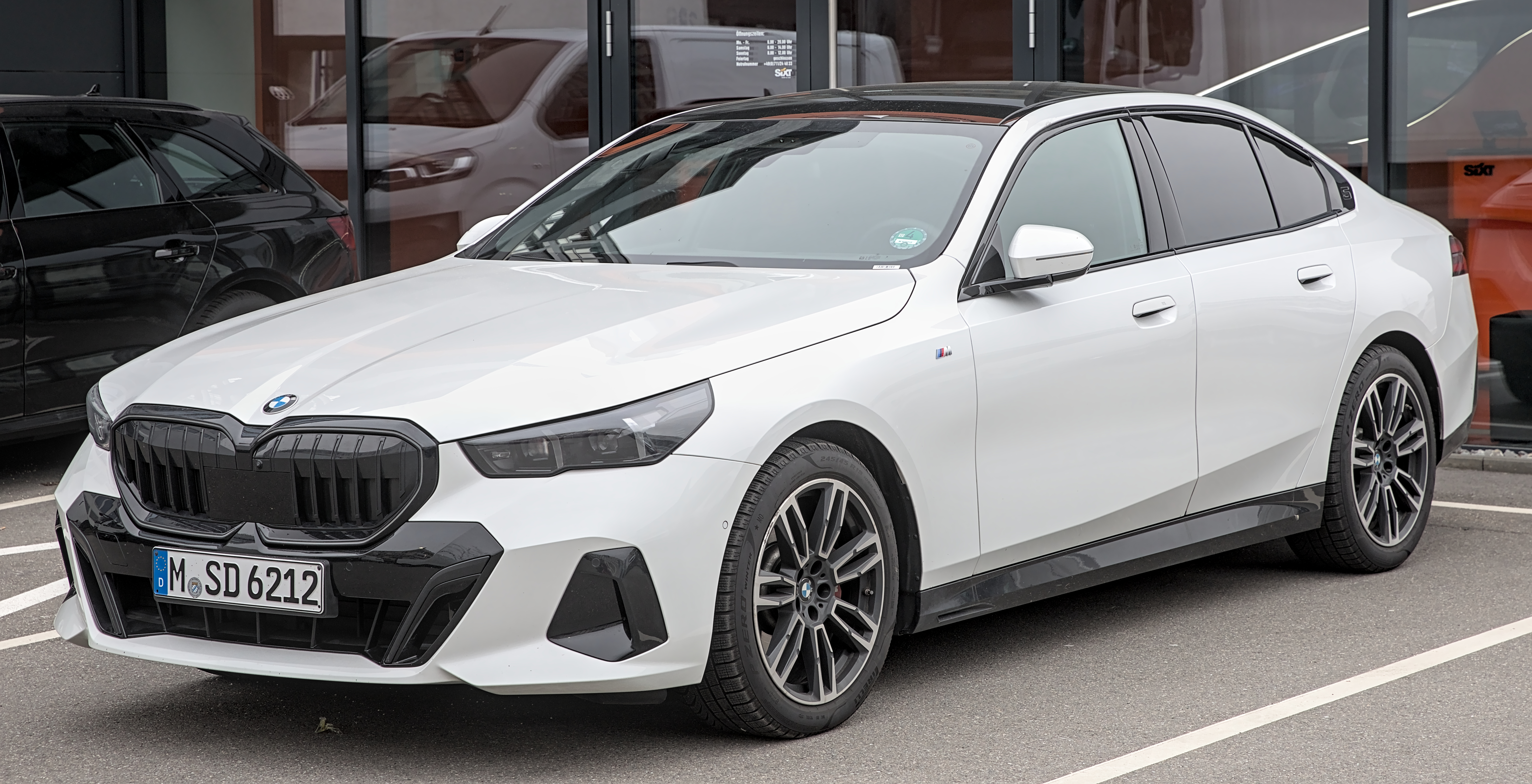
BMW 5 Series (G60)

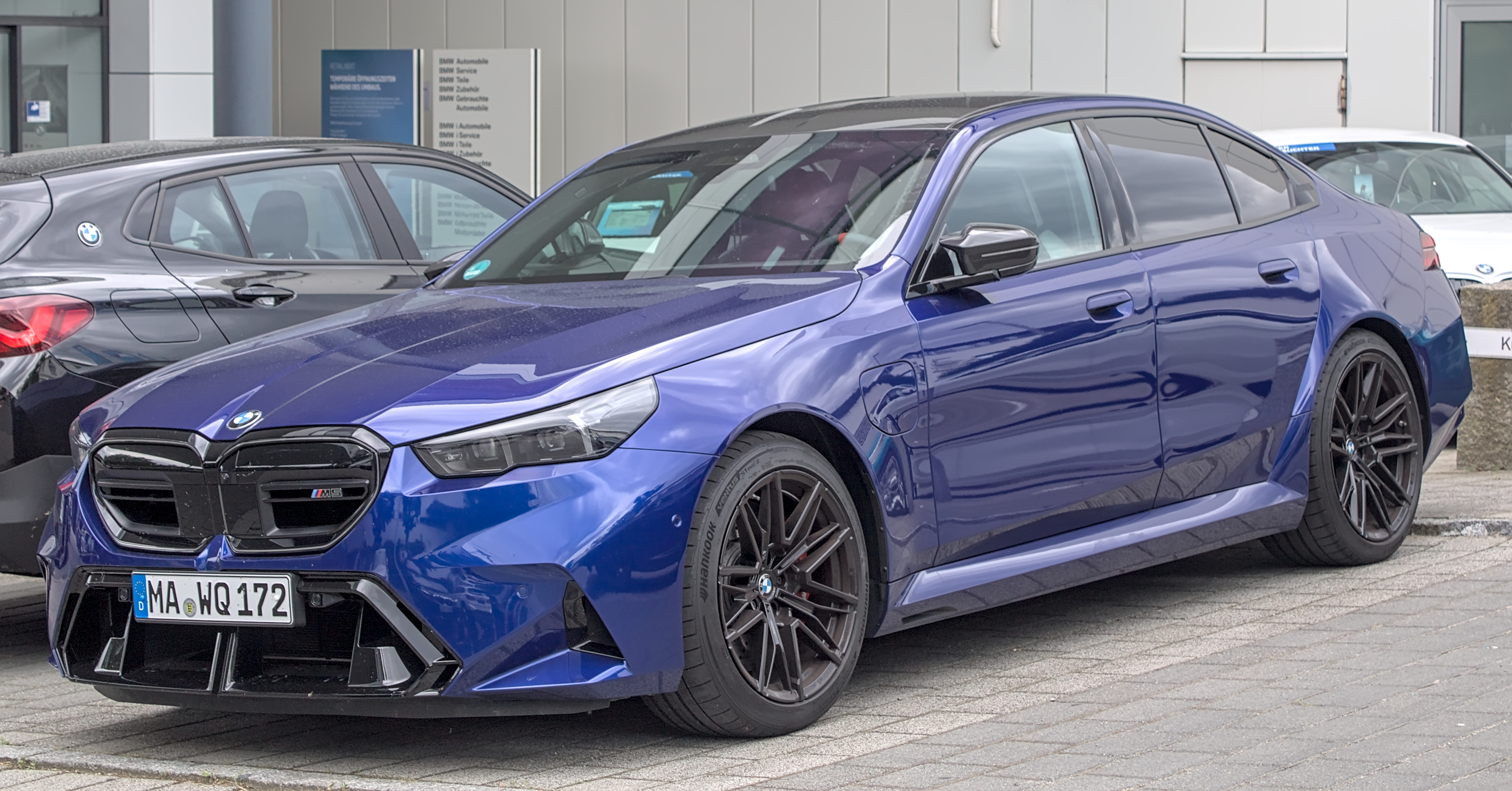
BMW M5 (G90)

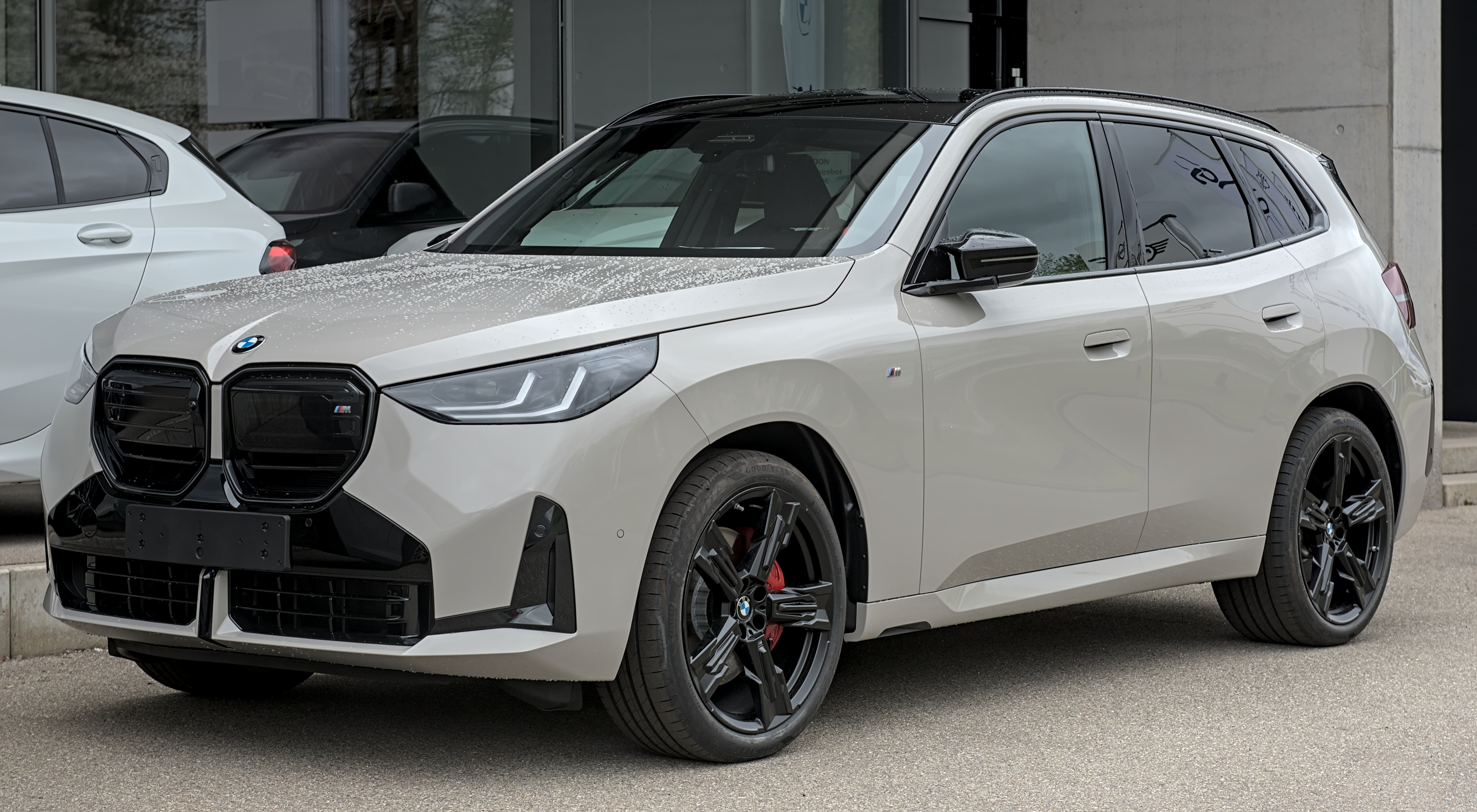
BMW X3 (G45)
