= BMW Vision Neue Klasse =

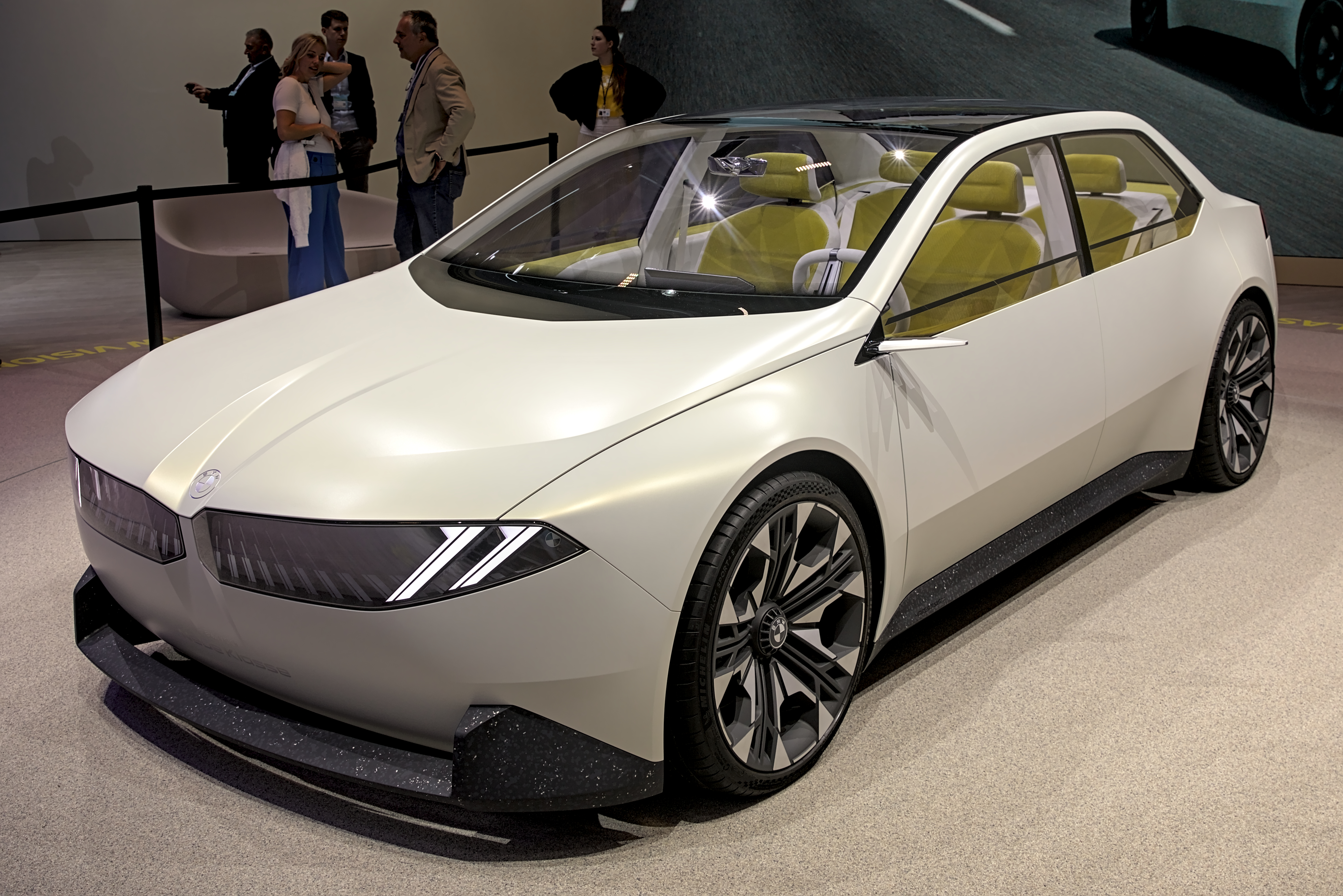
- BMW Vision Neue Klasse at IAA 2023

Overview
- Manufacturer: BMW
- Production: 2023
- Assembly: Hungary: Debrecen (Plant Debrecen); United States: Greer (Plant Spartanburg)
- Designer: Anders Thøgersen under Domagoj Đukec

Body and chassis
- Class: Compact executive car (D)
- Body style: 4-door coupe
- Platform: Neue Klasse platform
- Related: BMW Neue Klasse X BMW Neue Klasse Coupe

Chronology
- Predecessor: BMW i Vision Dee

The BMW Vision Neue Klasse is a concept car unveiled at the IAA Mobility 2023.

The design is an evolution of the i Vision Dee concept that debuted at CES 2023.

== Overview ==
The Vision Neue Klasse is an electric concept car that previews the design of the next generations of BMWs.

The linear design of the body features a "shark nose" that is tilted forward, 21-inch "aerodynamic wheels", and automatic opening and closing doors that are activated by sensors. A new front fascia is adopted in which the headlights are placed inside BMW's traditional kidney grille, and the taillights have a design with depth and breadth, with 3D printed light elements.

The interior has a simple design, with no chrome plating or leather used, and features the "BMW Panoramic Vision" projected onto the entire windshield, a square center display, and multi-function buttons on the steering wheel that can be operated.

The Vision Neue Klasse is equipped with the sixth generation BMW "eDrive" system and a newly developed battery using, like Tesla, cylindrical cells. This improves charging efficiency by up to 30% and driving range by up to 30%. Overall vehicle efficiency is also improved by up to 25%.

Vision Neue Klasse's production models will be manufactured at a new plant in Debrecen, Hungary and BMW Spartanburg in Greer, South Carolina.

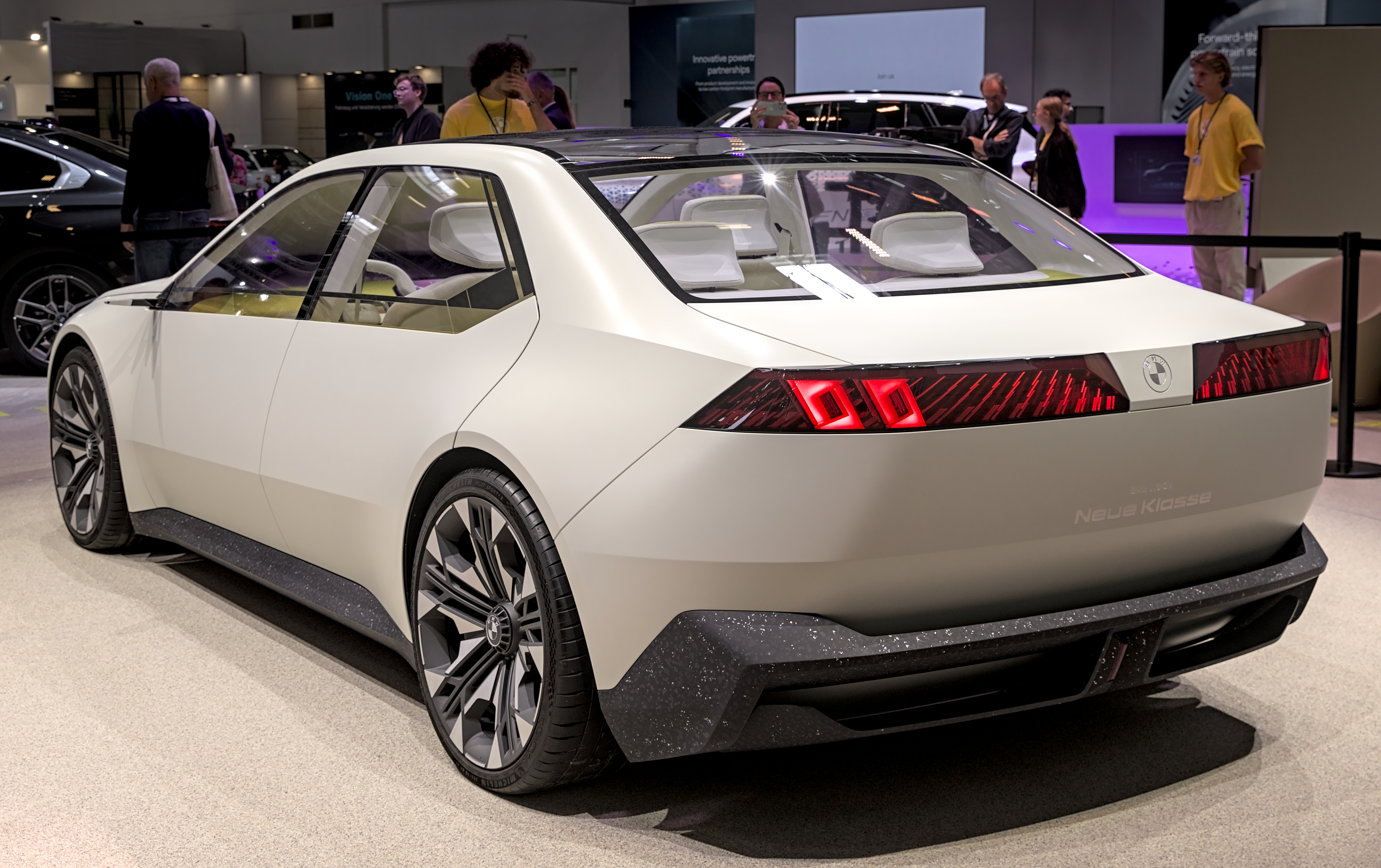
Rear view

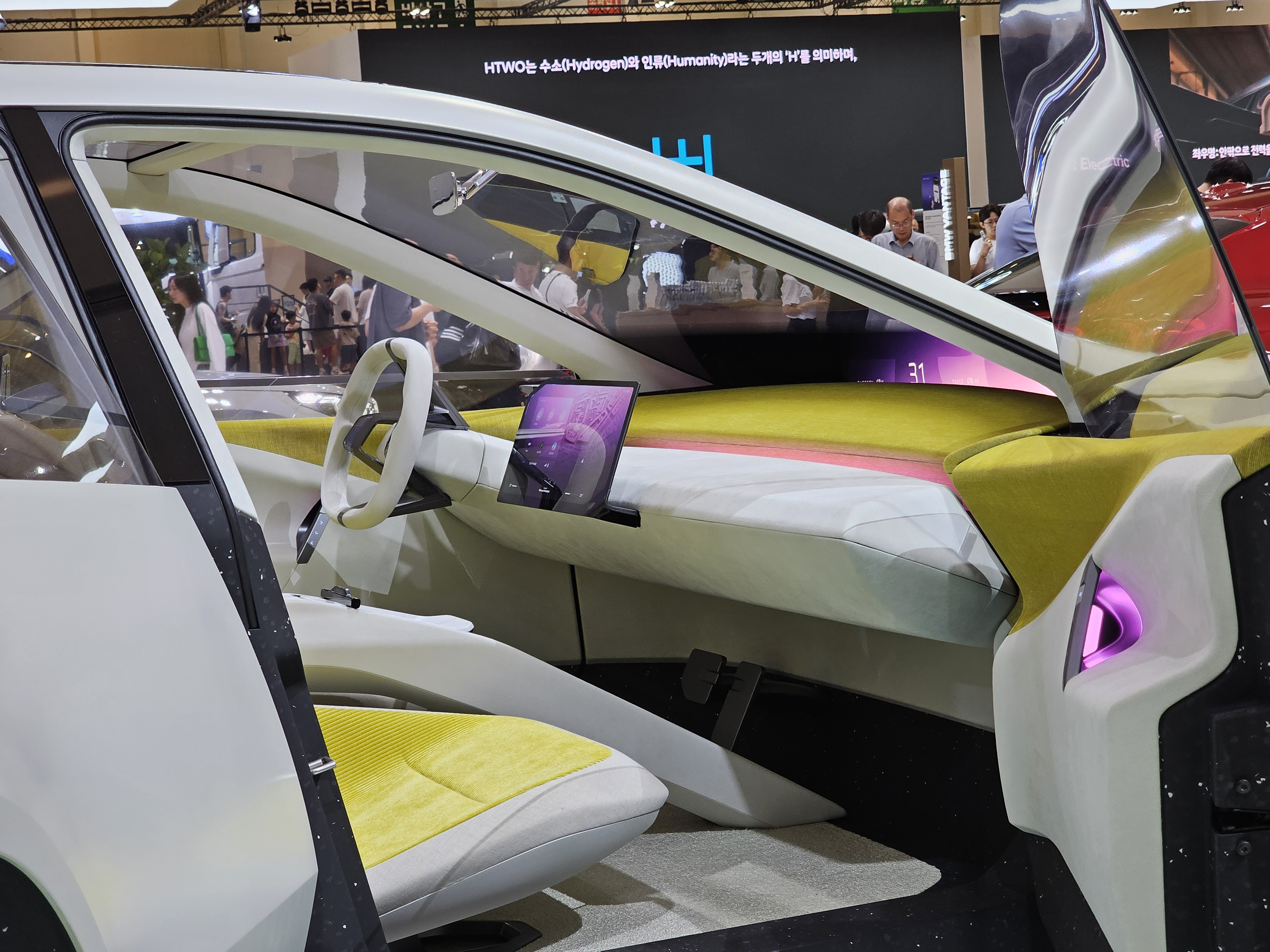
Interior
