= BMW i Vision Dee =

Electric concept car

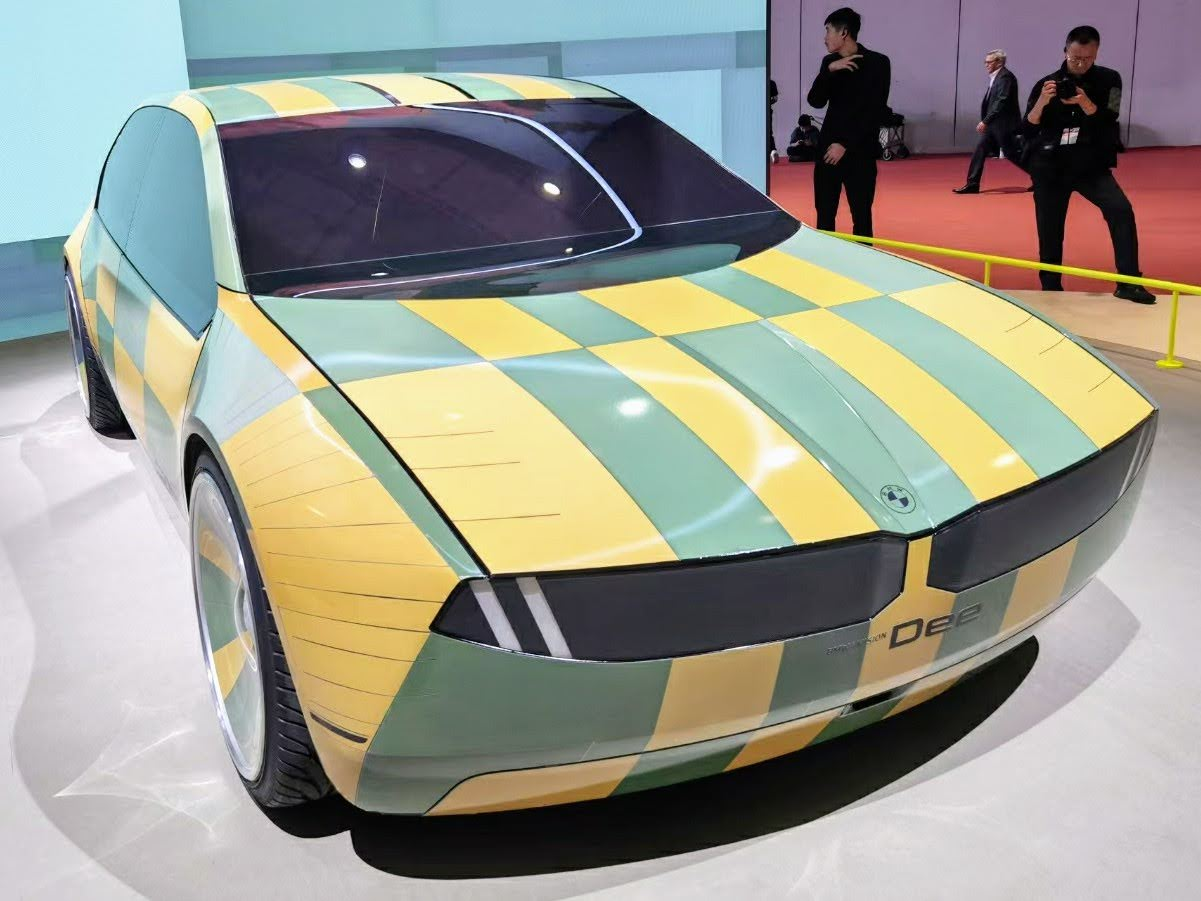

Overview
- Manufacturer: BMW
- Production: 2023
- Assembly: BMW

Body and chassis
- Class: concept car
- Body style: 4-door sedan

Powertrain
- Transmission: Single-speed with fixed ratio

Chronology
- Successor: BMW Vision Neue Klasse

The BMW i Vision Dee is an electric concept car marketed by the German car manufacturer BMW shown in CES 2023. It is a model based on the BMW i sub-brand. It reached production by 2025.

== History ==
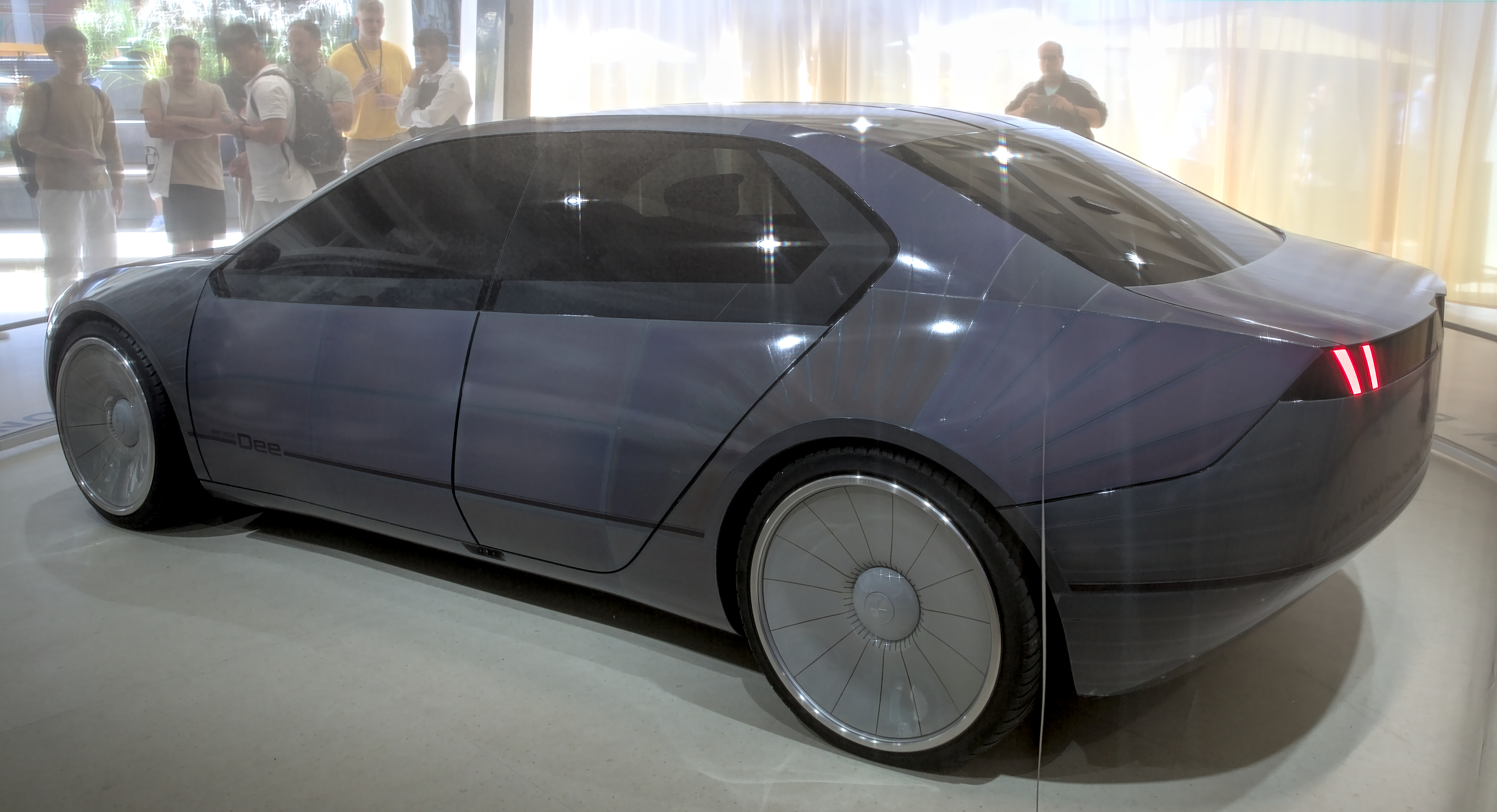
Rear view

On 4 January 2023, BMW presented the i Vision Dee at the Consumer Electronics Show in Las Vegas.

According to BMW CEO Oliver Zipse, the car "demonstrates the possibilities that the combination of hardware and software opens up". This allows the driver to use the digital potential. According to the CEO, the design was inspired by an old chessboard from 1967. The central control is a mixed reality slider that transforms the windshield into a portal of digital experiences periodically. Shy-Tech technology touch sensors allow the vehicle owner to set digital content levels. In terms of dimensions, the model is close to the BMW 3 Series. To communicate with the driver, a voice assistant is built into the car. He expresses emotions not only with his voice, but also with lighting equipment. Instead of touch screens, there is a head-up display on the windshield. The car also changes color.

The i Vision Dee was planned to mass-produced in 2025.
