= G200 =

G200 or G-200 may stand for:

== Computing and electronics ==
- GeForce 200 series, the engineering codename for a Graphics Processing Unit
- Matrox G200, a video accelerator chip

== Transport and vehicular ==
- Gulfstream G200, business jet
- Daihatsu Charade G200 automobile
- Giles G-200, an American aerobatic homebuilt aircraft
- Mistral G-200, a Swiss aircraft engine

== Other uses ==
- Gruz 200 (Russian: Груз 200, lit. 'Code 200'), is a military code word used in the Soviet Union and the post-Soviet states referring to the transportation of casualties

== See also ==
- 200G
- 200
- G (disambiguation)
- G20 (disambiguation)
- G2000 (disambiguation)
