= Wayne Handley =

American airshow performer

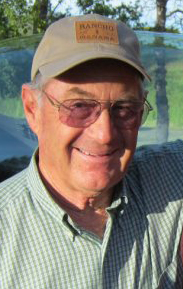
Portrait of Handley

Wayne Handley (born March 26, 1939, in Carmel, California) is an American airshow performer, former naval aviator, agricultural pilot, Aerobatic Competency Evaluator (ACE), and coach for upcoming and current airshow stars. Handley and his wife Karen are former residents of the Salinas Valley of California, and Groveland, California who currently reside in Monterey, California

Handley's father wouldn't allow him to fly while living under his roof, but in 1957, while attending Hartnell College in Salinas, Handley got in touch with the campus flying club, and took his first lesson in an Aeronca 7AC Champion. Two years later, he had 70 hours in his logbook, left College and enlisted in the US Navy. He trained through propeller-driven aircraft up into the Grumman F9F Cougar and F-11 Tiger carrier-based fighters. In 1963, when faced with the choice of either transitioning into the F-4 Phantom or taking an aerial application job back at home, he chose to be with his family, and started flying agricultural operations in fixed wing aircraft and rotorcraft. Handley began flying aerobatics after taking ownership of a Pitts S-1C in the early 1980s, and entered his first International Aerobatic Club contest in 1983.

In 2015, with over 27,000 hours of flight time logged, Handley is a highly respected, record-setting aviator who received the California Agricultural Aircraft Association's Outstanding Airman Award in 1985; the International Aerobatic Club named him the California Unlimited Aerobatic Champion also in 1985, the Bill Barber Award for Showmanship in 1996, the Art Scholl Memorial Showmanship Award in 1997, the Crystal Eagle Award in 2000, and the International Council of Airshows Sword of Excellence in 2001, and induction into the International Council of Airshows Airshow Hall of Fame. In 1989, he set the world records for inverted flat spins, with 67 consecutive revolutions. In April 1999, he beat his own record, with 78 rotations flying a Giles G-202. In 1999, he also set multiple time-to-climb records in his Turbo Raven.

On the airshow circuit, he initially flew a Pitts Special biplane in an act that he called Agrobatics in which he merged some of the techniques that an agricultural pilot might employ while applying chemicals to crops with his own graceful style of aerobatic flying. He would fly under a ribbon stretched between two poles which simulated power lines; afterwards he performed an inverted cut of that ribbon using his propeller. After a few years in the Pitts, he started work on a one-of-a-kind aircraft which would be known as the Raven.

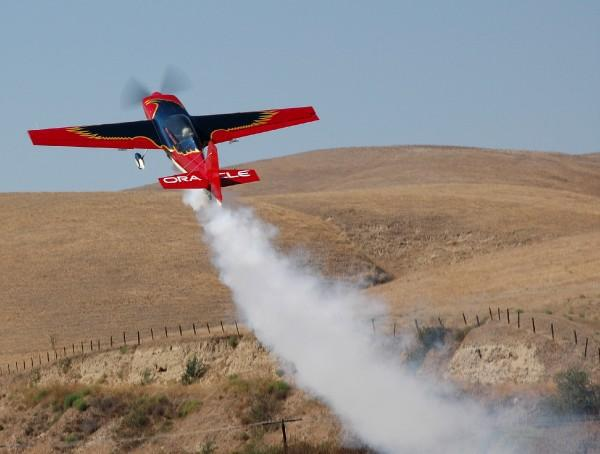
Raven Climbout

The Raven is a composite monoplane with a unique paint scheme that paid tribute to the bird species Corvus corax, which has been observed performing aerobatics apparently for fun. Registered as a Kraska Rebel 2300 homebuilt aircraft (N711WH), Handley modified the design with a wing designed for the Zivko Edge 540, and many other custom details such that the Raven was a one-of-a-kind aircraft of Handley's design. The Raven was capable of +/-16G, over 380 degrees per second roll rate, a 4,000-foot (1,200 m) per minute rate of climb, stunning tumbles, torque rolls, tailslides, and any other maneuver Handley could create. This aircraft performed for airshow crowds for over a decade up until August 2005, when it was retired to the Evergreen Aviation Museum.

In 1998, with sponsorship by Oracle, he set out to create the Oracle Turbo Raven, which was the world's only aerobatic aircraft with a thrust-to-weight ratio higher than one (more thrust than weight). He teamed up with Richard Giles of AkroTech Aviation, and AgAir Systems, and the Oracle Turbo Raven was built and registered as a Giles G-750 (N17HE). The composite airframe was based on the Giles G-202 design, with an empty weight of 1,600 pounds (725 kg). It was fitted with a 750 horsepower (560 kW) Pratt & Whitney PT6A-25C turboprop that generated 2,800 pounds (12,500 N) of thrust, which gave the aircraft a power loading of less than 2.7 lb/hp at ready-to-fly weights. With this power loading, the Oracle Turbo Raven could fly straight up, hover in mid-air, back up, stop, and then accelerate straight up out of the hover. The aircraft also had enough power that it could recover from flat spins simply by flying out of them with the nose still on the horizon. The aircraft had a maximum speed of 300 mph (480 km/h) and a roll rate of 450 degrees per second.

On January 20, 1999, Handley once again got into the record books by flying the Turbo Raven from brake release to 3,000 meters in one minute and nine seconds. In July 1999 at EAA AirVenture Oshkosh, the Turbo Raven took three minutes, six seconds to get to 6,000 meters, and established the Turbo Raven as the fastest-climbing propeller-driven aircraft in the world. This aircraft was also able to reverse the pitch of its propeller blades in flight, and could actually slow down while diving towards the ground; Handley used this ability to make very steep approaches to land, as well as for unique maneuvers where he could slow below stall speed while diving. On October 3, 1999, exactly one year to the day after its debut, the Turbo Raven was destroyed after the engine failed to deliver power during one such approach at the California International Airshow at Salinas Municipal Airport, and Handley was unable to accelerate above stall speed with the propeller in reverse pitch. He was seriously injured, his Aorta almost shattered, his L2 Vertebrae Damaged, but made a full recovery, and was flying within a month after the accident. This accident was featured on the 2002 Television show “Now See This”, Season 1 Episode 3.

Handley continues to train, coach, and evaluate aerobatic students and airshow pilots from the ground and in flight as well as presenting safety seminars on spins and unusual attitudes.
