= Mistral G-300 =

Aircraft engine

G-300
- Type: Aircraft engine
- National origin: Switzerland
- Manufacturer: Mistral Engines

The Mistral G-300 is a Swiss aircraft engine designed and produced by Mistral Engines of Geneva for use in light aircraft.

== Design and development ==
The engine is a three-rotor, 3X3X654 cc (39.9 cu in) displacement, liquid-cooled, gasoline Wankel engine design, with a mechanical gearbox reduction drive. It employs dual electronic ignition systems and produces 300 hp (224 kW) at 2250 rpm.

== Applications ==
- Seaflight Shearwater

== Specifications (G-300) ==
Data from Tacke

=== General characteristics ===
- Type: Three-rotor Wankel aircraft engine
- Displacement: 3X3X654 cc (39.9 cu in)
- Dry weight: 177 kg (390.2 lb)

=== Components ===
- Fuel type: gasoline
- Cooling system: liquid
- Reduction gear: mechanical gearbox

=== Performance ===
- Power output: 300 hp (224 kW)

== See also ==
Related lists

- List of aircraft engines
