= BMW 3 Series (G20) =

Seventh generation of the BMW 3 Series

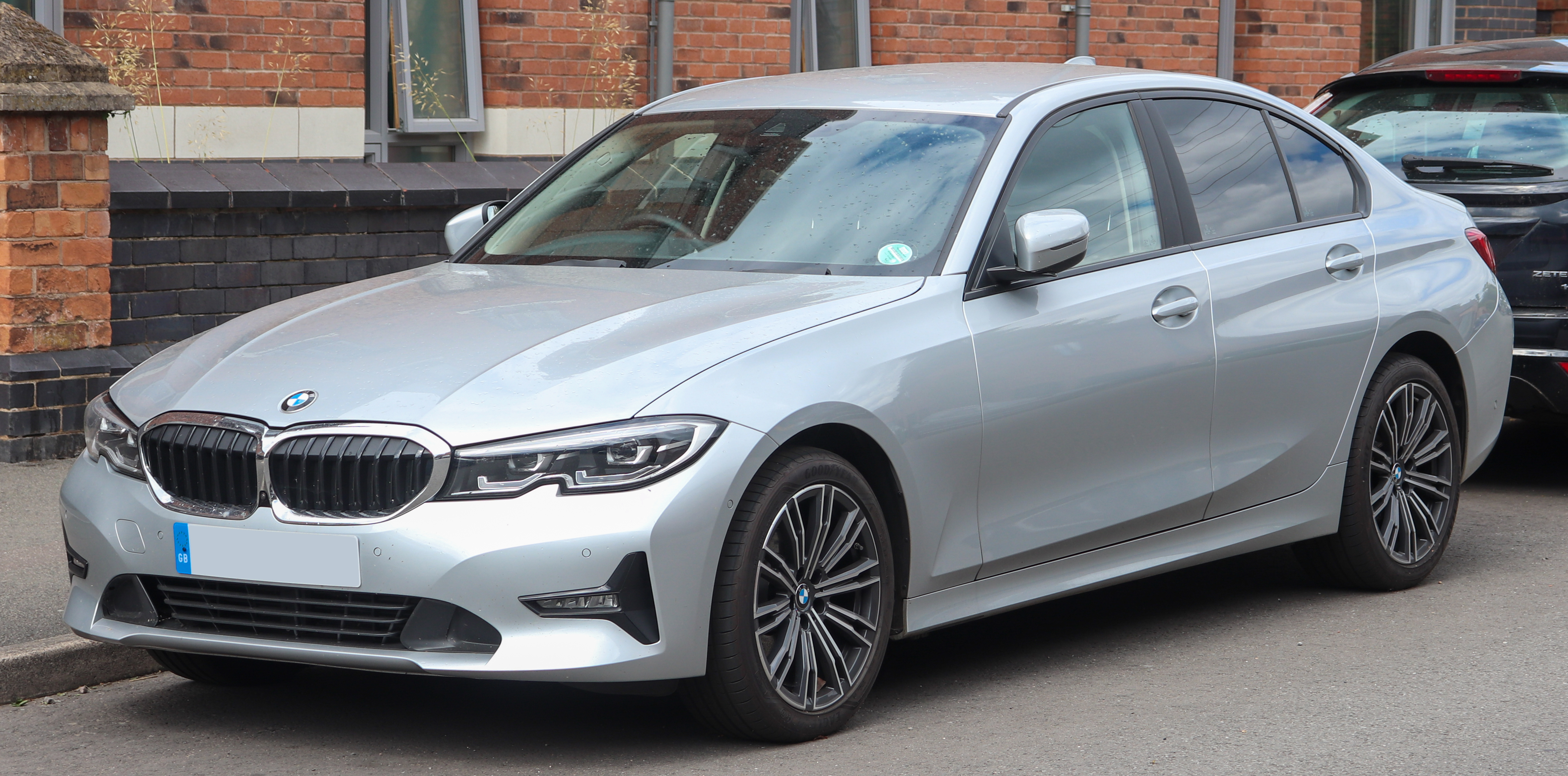
- G20 BMW 3 series (pre-facelift)

Overview
- Manufacturer: BMW
- Model code: G20 (sedan); G21 (wagon); G28 (long-wheelbase sedan); G28 BEV (i3)
- Also called: BMW i3 (battery electric, China)
- Production: October 2018 – 2026
- Model years: 2019–2026
- Assembly: Germany: Munich (BMW Group Plant Munich); China: Tiexi, Shenyang (BBA); Mexico: San Luis Potosí; India: Chennai (BMW India); Thailand: Rayong (BMW Thailand); Indonesia: Jakarta (Gaya Motor); Malaysia: Kulim, Kedah (Inokom); Brazil: Araquari; Vietnam: Chu Lai (THACO Truong Hai)
- Designer: Alexey Kezha; Marc Michael Markefka

Body and chassis
- Class: Compact executive car (D)
- Body style: 4-door sedan (G20/G28); 5-door wagon (G21)
- Layout: Front-engine, rear-wheel-drive; Front-engine, four-wheel-drive (xDrive)
- Platform: BMW CLAR platform
- Related: BMW M3 (G80/G81); BMW 4 Series (G22/G23); BMW 2 Series (G42); BMW X3 (G01)

Powertrain
- Engine: Petrol: 1.6 L B48 turbo I4; 2.0 L B48 turbo I4; 3.0 L B58 turbo I6; 3.0 L S58 turbo I6; Petrol plug-in hybrid: 2.0 L B48 turbo I4; Diesel: 2.0 L B47 turbo I4; 3.0 L B57 turbo I6
- Electric motor: 50 kW (67 hp) Synchronous electric motor (PHEV, 2018–2019), 80 kW (107 hp) Synchronous electric motor (PHEV, 2020–present)
- Transmission: 6-speed manual (till 2022); 8-speed ZF 8HP automatic
- Hybrid drivetrain: Mild hybrid Plug-in hybrid
- Battery: 12 kWh Lithium ion (PHEV)

Dimensions
- Wheelbase: 2,851 mm (112.2 in); 2,961 mm (116.6 in) (LWB)
- Length: 4,709 mm (185.4 in); 4,829 mm (190.1 in) (LWB)
- Width: 1,827 mm (71.9 in)
- Height: 1,442 mm (56.8 in)
- Curb weight: 1,450–1,965 kg (3,196.7–4,332.1 lb)

Chronology
- Predecessor: BMW 3 Series (F30)
- Successor: BMW 3 Series (G50); BMW i3 (NA0) (Electric version)

The seventh generation of the BMW 3 Series range consists of the BMW G20 (sedan version) and BMW G21 (wagon version, marketed as 'Touring') compact executive cars. The G20/G21 has been in production since mid-October 2018 with a facelift in July 2022 and is often collectively referred to as the G20.

The M340i, one of the first models in the range, became available for sale in the spring of 2019, with the 330e plug-in hybrid model also launching in 2019. The 3 Series Gran Turismo fastback body style was discontinued for the G20 generation and has been replaced by the 4 Series Gran Coupé.

For this generation, BMW has begun G20 production in Mexico for various world markets including the US, replacing the Rosslyn plant in South Africa where the X3 has been produced instead. The G21 Station Wagon models are exclusively assembled at the Munich plant.

== Development and launch ==
At the end of November 2015, a final design proposal for the successor of the F30 3 Series by Alexey Kezha out of 3 total, was chosen by BMW management, as reported by Auto Bild in October 2015. The new 3 Series, internally called the G20, was unveiled at the 2018 Paris Motor Show on October 2, 2018, and was available for sale in March 2019.

The G20 3 Series is based on the Cluster Architecture (CLAR) platform and features increased use of high-strength steel and aluminium. The G20 has a MacPherson strut front suspension and multi-link rear suspension, with a hydraulic damping system to better absorb impacts.

The G20 has a flat and covered underbody, resulting in a reduced drag coefficient from 0.26 Cd to 0.23 Cd for the 320d. Compared to its predecessor, the G20 is 55 kg (121 lb) lighter, 85 mm (3.3 in) longer, and 16 mm (0.6 in) wider. The car retains a 50:50 weight distribution and has a 50% increase in body rigidity. Boot capacity is identical to the F30, at 480 litres (17 cu ft).

The windshield uses double-glazed acoustic glass and the A-pillars have increased insulation. The parking brake is now electronically operated and no longer uses a manual lever. Engine coasting is also now available in both Eco Pro and Comfort modes, and both petrol and diesel models receive engine particulate filters.

The 320d, 320i, 330d, 330i and M340i are available in both rear-wheel drive and all-wheel drive (xDrive) variants. Deliveries of the M340i xDrive in India began in January 2023.

The Touring variant (G21) was launched on 12 June 2019.

The long-wheelbase variant (G28) in China was launched in April 2019 as a single trim, the 325Li, which uses the same 2.0 liter turbocharged engine making 184 hp and 300 N⋅m (221 lb⋅ft) of torque as the global 320i and is mated to a 8-speed automatic transmission as the only drivetrain offered. Later, a less expensive variant, called the 320Li, was introduced. This variant uses the same engine as the global 318i, producing 154 hp and 250 N⋅m (184 lb⋅ft) of torque and is mated with a 8-speed automatic transmission. The wheelbase was extended by 110 mm (4.3 in). The right hand drive LWB variant in India, the 330Li, is scheduled for release by 2021 to replace the 3 GT. The 330Li uses a 2.0 liter turbocharged engine making 258 hp. This version was subsequently released in selected Southeast Asian markets like Thailand and Malaysia, complementing the existing standard-wheelbase variants already sold there.

In 2020, the 320d model variants were given a mild hybrid drivetrain as standard, with subsequent models also gaining this as well.

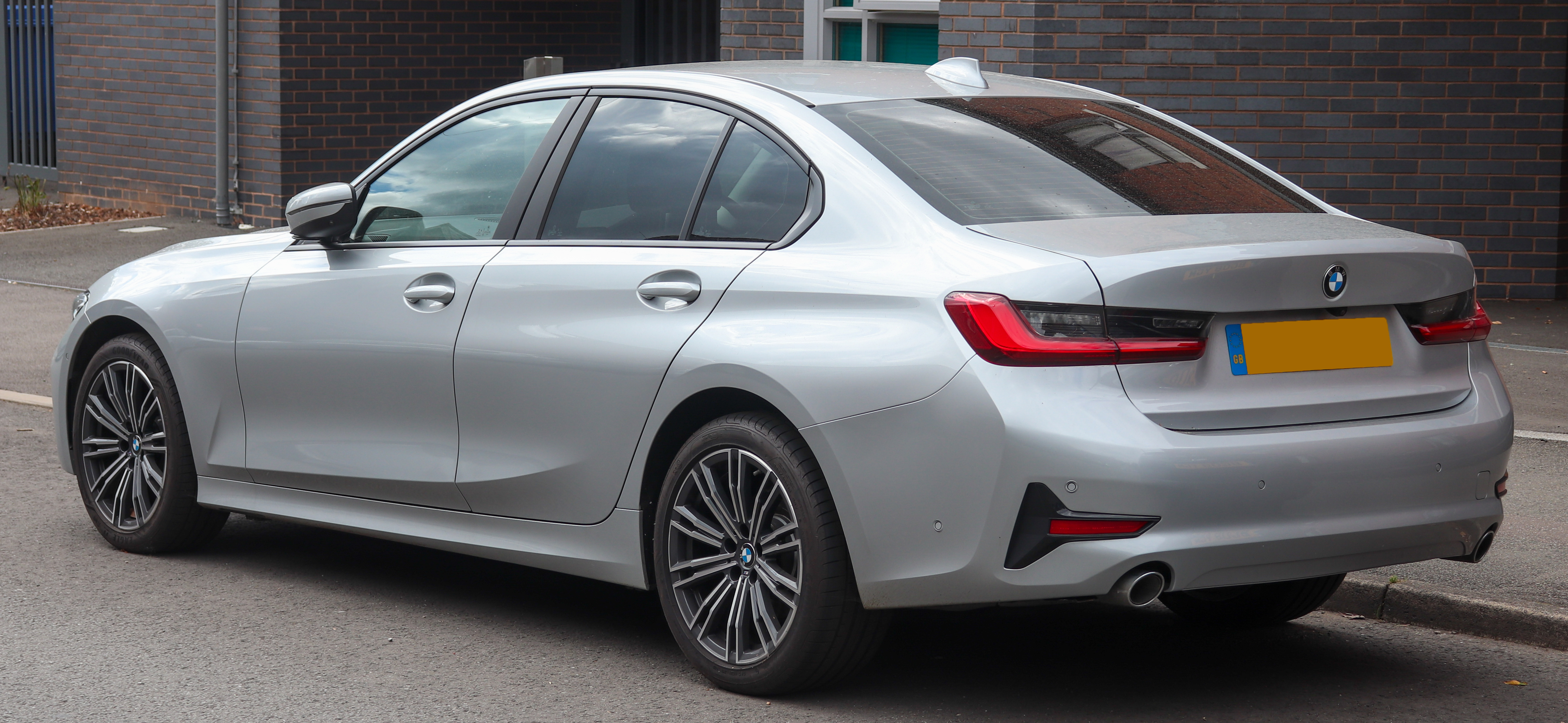
G20 BMW 3 series (pre-facelift)

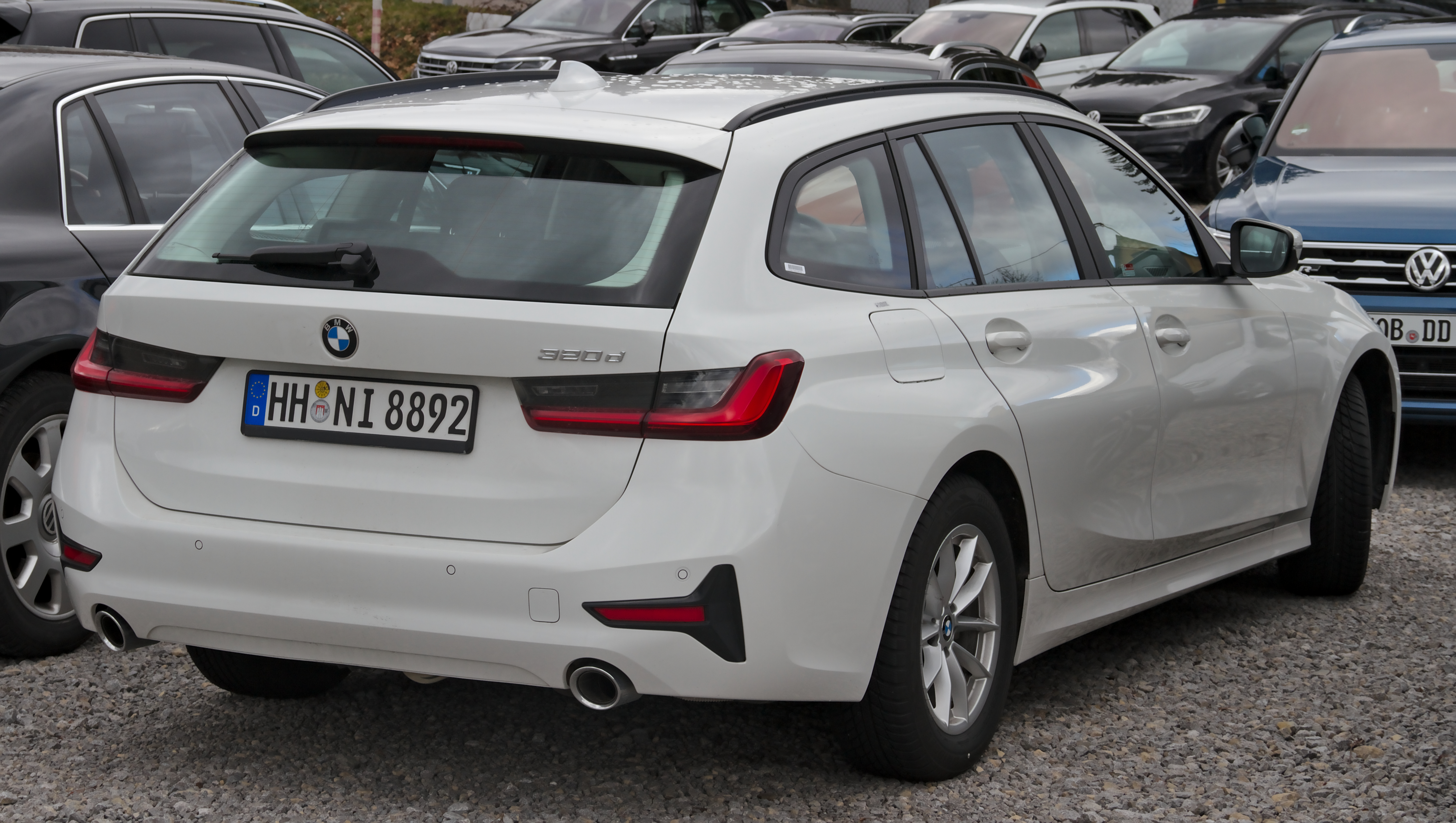
G21 BMW 3 series (pre-facelift)

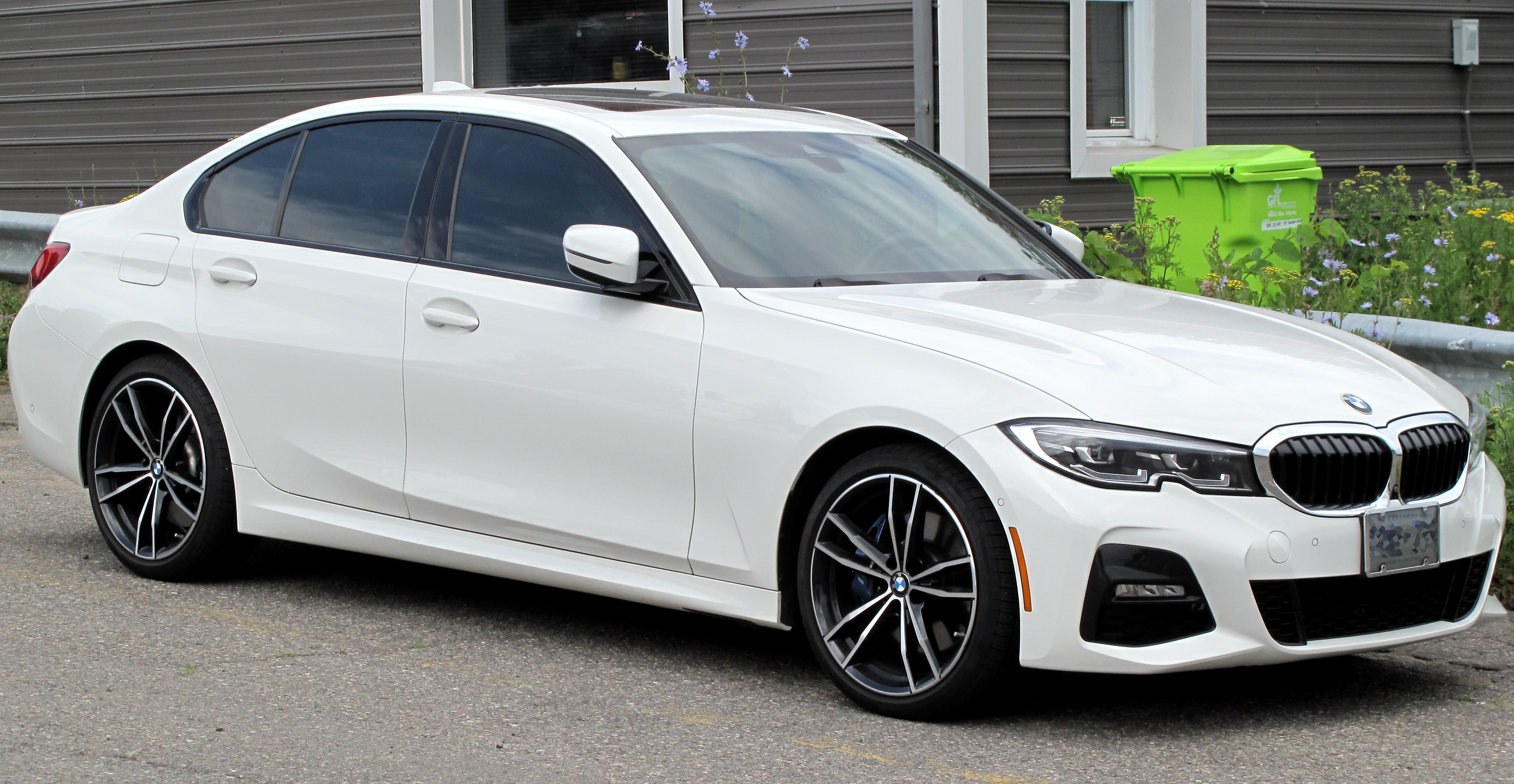
G20 BMW 3 series M Sport (pre-facelift)

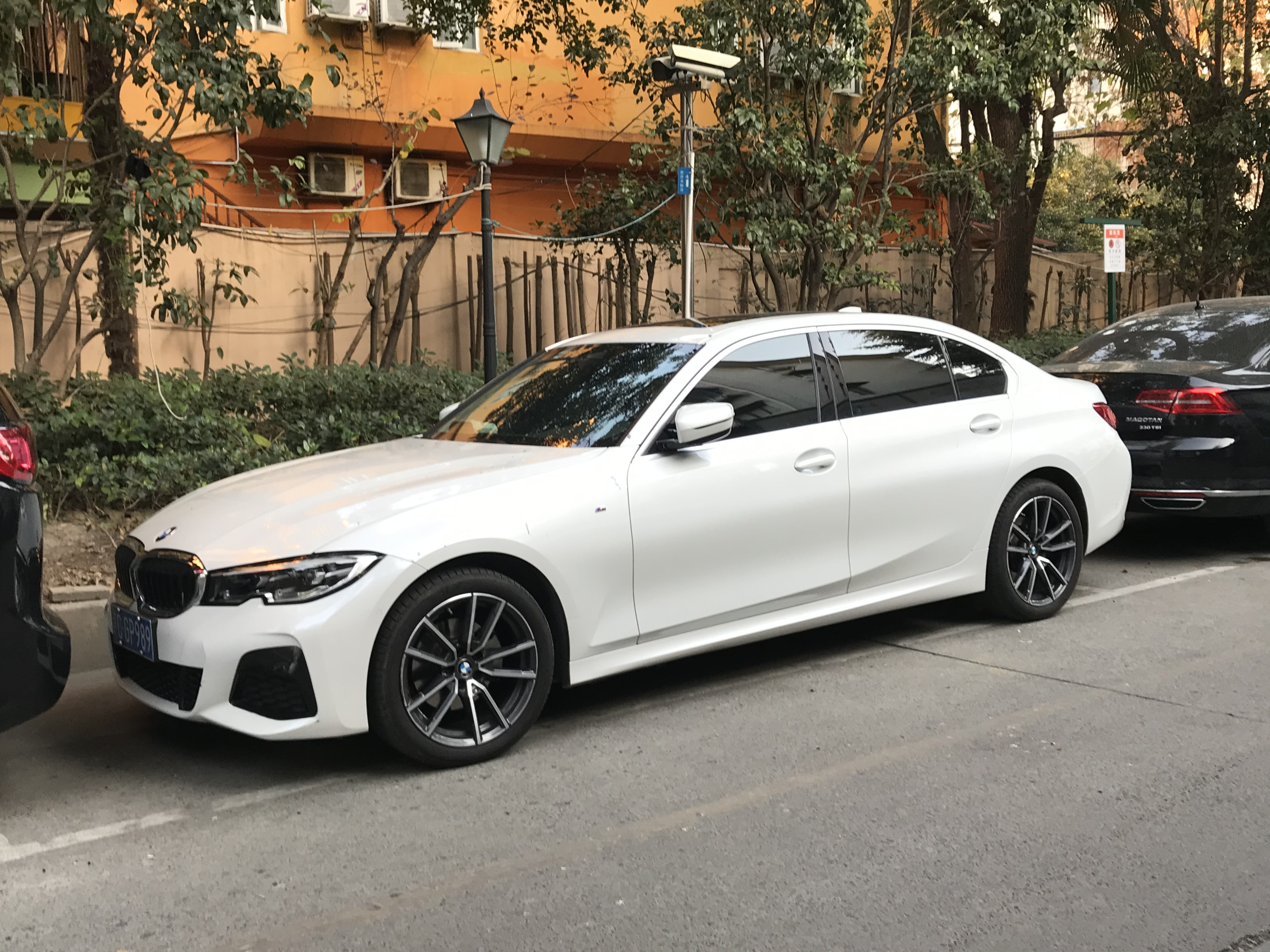
G28 BMW 325Li (pre-facelift)

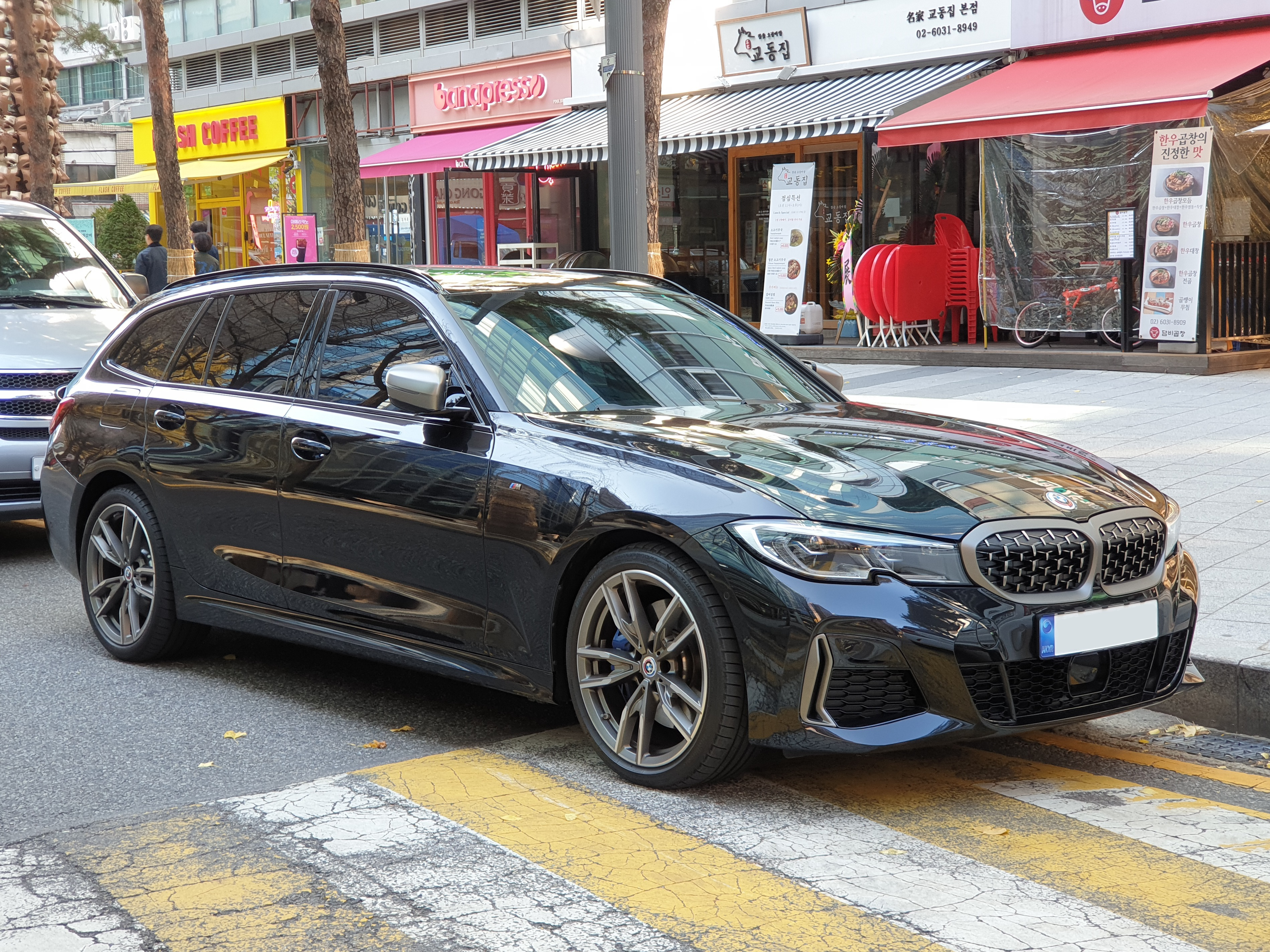
G21 BMW M340i (pre-facelift)

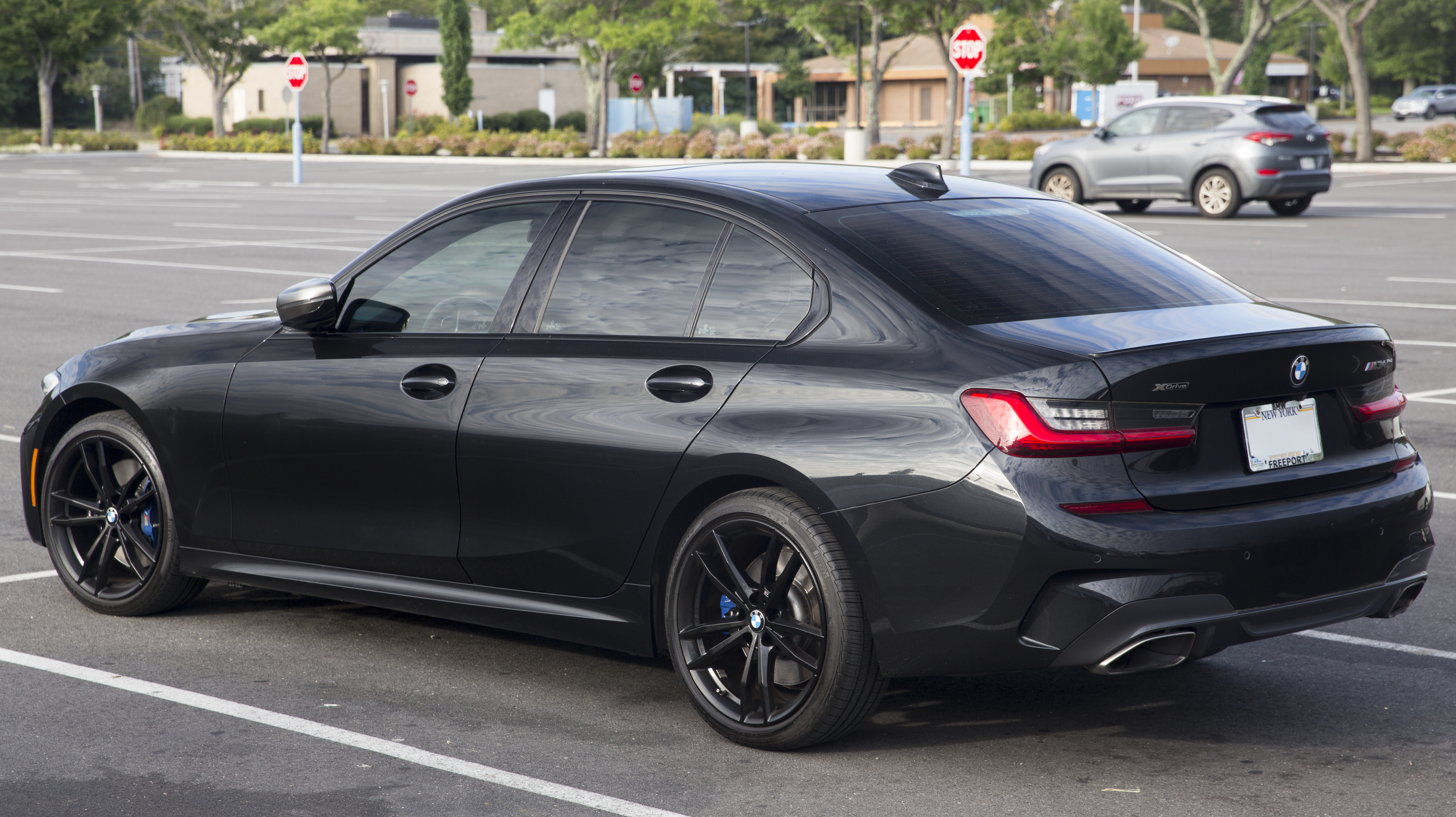
G20 BMW M340i (pre-facelift)

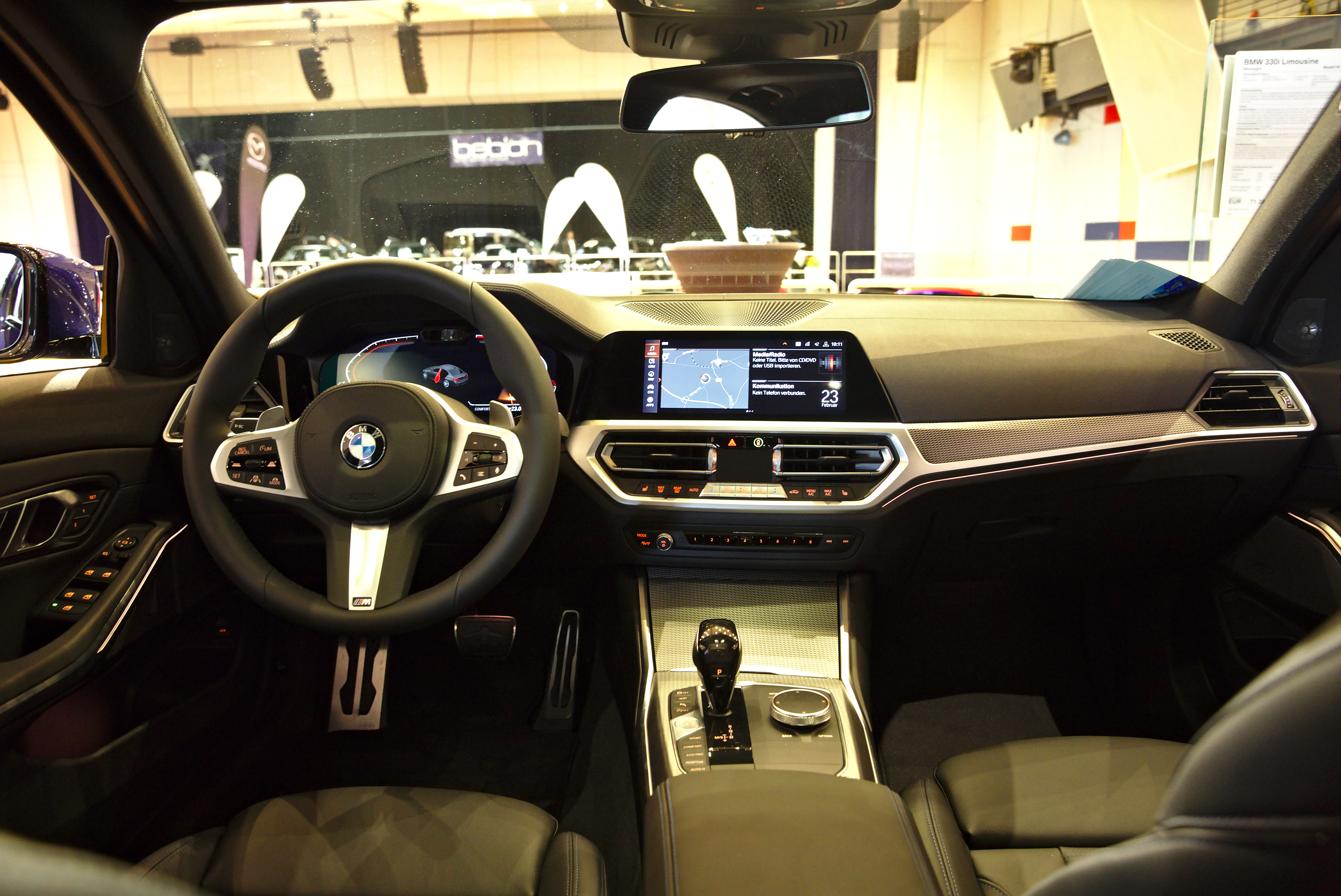
Interior (pre-facelift)

=== Equipment ===
The pre-LCI (2019–2022) G20 was available in Advantage, Sport Line, Luxury Line, or M Sport package.

The LCI (2022–present) G20 is available in Baseline/Sport, M Sport and M Sport Pro trims.

Standard equipment includes full LED headlights and tail-lights, automatic climate control, automatic headlights and rain-sensing wipers, 40:20:40 split folding rear seats, and driver assistance systems including lane departure warning and collision warning with braking intervention.

For the pre-LCI (2019–2022) BMW G20 all models (except when fitted with the plug-in hybrid drivetrain) featured iDrive 6.0 with an 8.8-inch display and a hybrid instrument cluster called "Live Cockpit Plus" as standard. The system could be upgraded to iDrive 7.0 with a 10.25-inch display and 12.3-inch digital instrument cluster called "Live Cockpit Professional" with plug-in hybrid models receiving it as standard equipment. iDrive 7.0 has over-the-air updates for the navigational maps and operating system, and features a voice-controlled digital assistant that can be activated by saying "Hey BMW". The assistant can control in-car functions and is integrated with Microsoft Office 365 and Skype for Business. From mid-2020 the Live Cockpit Plus system was upgraded to the same iDrive 7.0 system as in the Live Cockpit Professional, with the instrument cluster reverted to the traditional analog gauges style and the 8.8-inch display remained the same as the iDrive 6.0-based system. The engine start stop system uses the navigation system to prevent unnecessary engine shutdowns.

With the LCI introduced in 2022 all models come standard with the "BMW Curved Display" which integrates both a 14.9-inch infotainment display and a 12.3-inch instruments display. The system features iDrive with BMW OS 8, sometimes referred to as iDrive 8.

Optional equipment includes the BMW LaserLight, a BMW display key, self-righting wheel center caps, and a Welcome Light Carpet. A Digital Key system enables a smartphone to lock or unlock the vehicle using near-field communication, and will start the engine when placed in the wireless charging tray. The optional parking assistant system displays a three-dimensional 360 degree view of the car and its surroundings, which can also be remotely viewed in the BMW ConnectedDrive app.

316i–330i models with the M Sport package and M340 models can be fitted with M Performance Parts. This includes a splitter, lip spoiler, tailpipes, sport brakes, darker taillights and more carbon fibre parts.

Only 318d and selected 320d models are available with a 6-speed manual transmission, though in some markets the 318i is also available with it.

BMW had controversially implemented a yearly fee for access to Apple CarPlay, a feature built into the car, and for which BMW pays no yearly fee or other ongoing expense. As of December 2019 it is reported that this fee will no longer be charged as BMW has backtracked on this decision.

In March 2019 at the Geneva Motor Show, the 330e iPerformance model was introduced. It shares its engine with the 320i and a 50 kW (67 hp) electric motor, it has a maximum electric range of 60 km (37 mi). It has a 12 kWh battery (9.6 kWh usable) along with a newly developed system called "XtraBoost" allowing a temporary power increase from the electric motor of up to 30 kW (40 hp).

== Facelift ==
A facelift (LCI) was announced in May 2022 for the seventh generation BMW 3 Series.

The updated model has new front and rear bumpers, new headlights and a slightly tweaked grille. The headlights have a new "inverted L shape" DRL signature (that is now standard on all models) and the top Laserlight option is replaced by new adaptive LED units with matrix high beam functionality. The grille maintains its overall proportions while the bumper gets new designs for both the base version and the M Sport package. Both feature new side air curtains, while the latter has a larger central intake (although part of it serves for design purposes only) and more aggressive styling. Tail lights carry the same design as the 2019 model, but are complemented by newly designed bumpers. The base version features body colored graphics, while the M Sport has a large, gloss-black element that incorporates a faux diffuser and two vertically arranged reflectors.

The interior gets a significant update, with the dashboard being shaped by a new dual curved display that comes as standard and features iDrive with BMW Operating System 8. With the 2025 model year, iDrive uses BMW Operating System 8.5.

The ZF 8-speed automatic transmission is also fitted as standard, replacing the 6-speed manual entirely, and a new gear selector lever is also present.

For the 2026 model year in the United States, 330i and M340i models were produced in Munich, coinciding with production of the M340i xDrive 50 Jahre Edition.

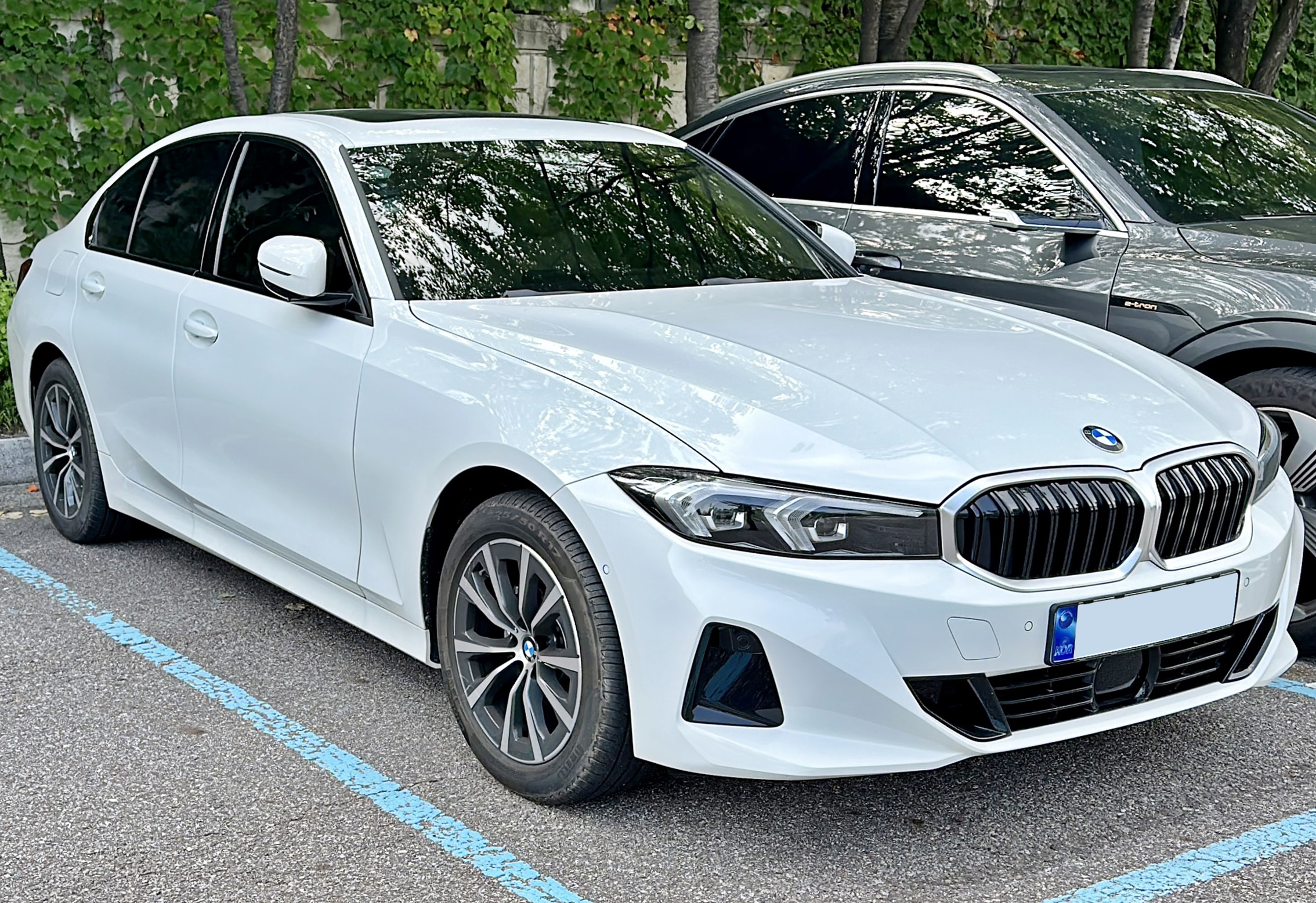
G20 BMW 3 series (facelift)

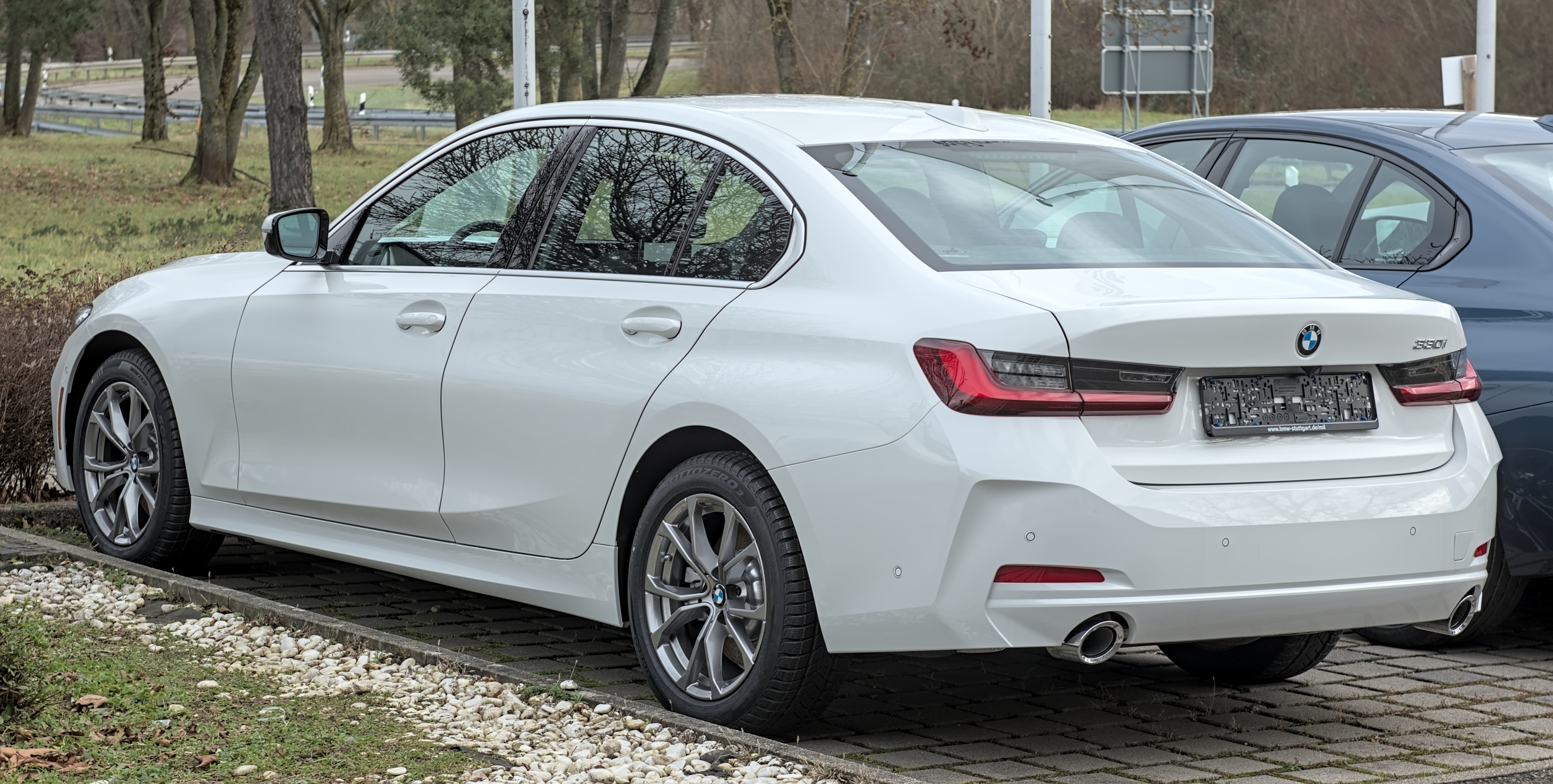
G20 BMW 3 series (facelift)

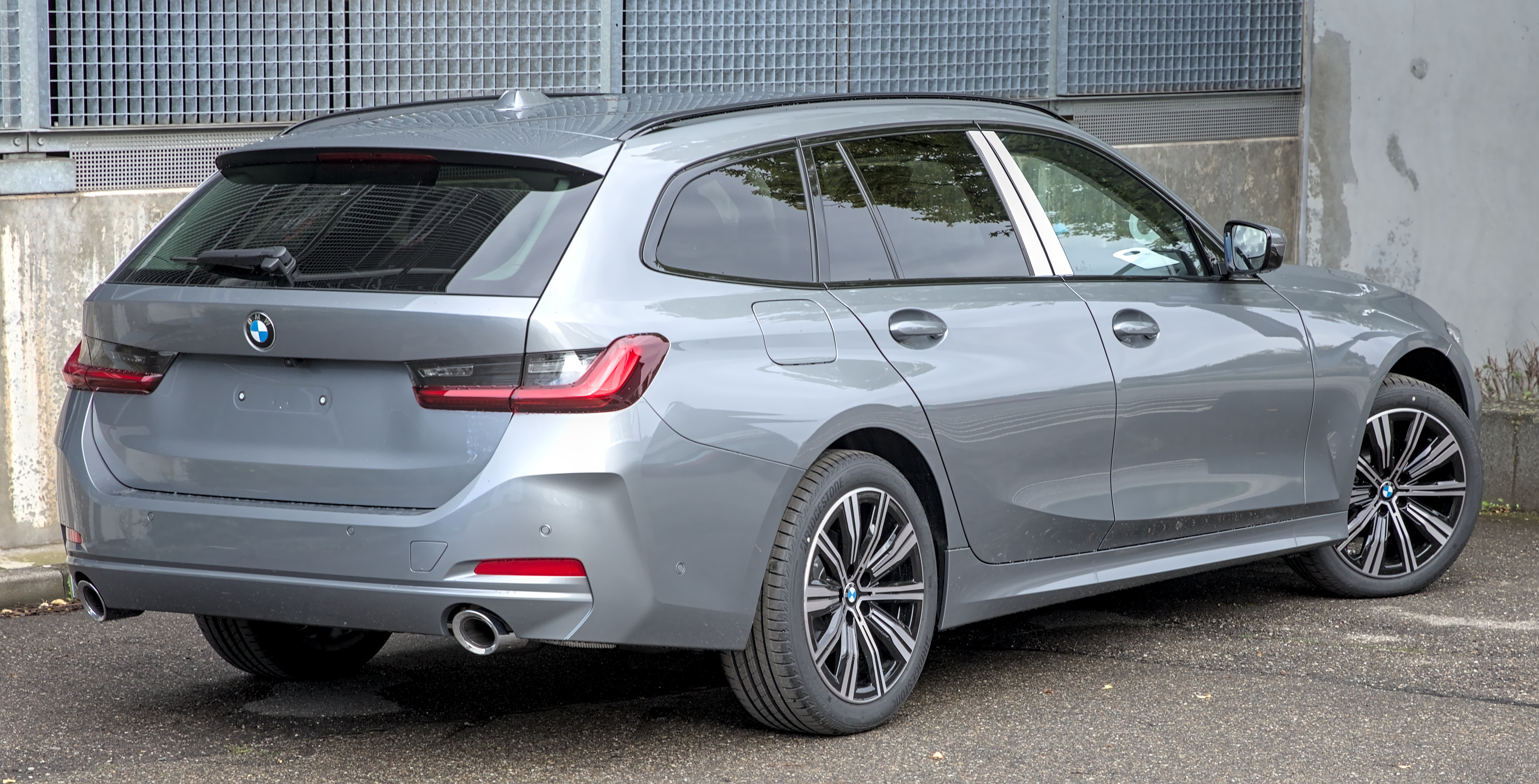
G21 BMW 3 series (facelift)

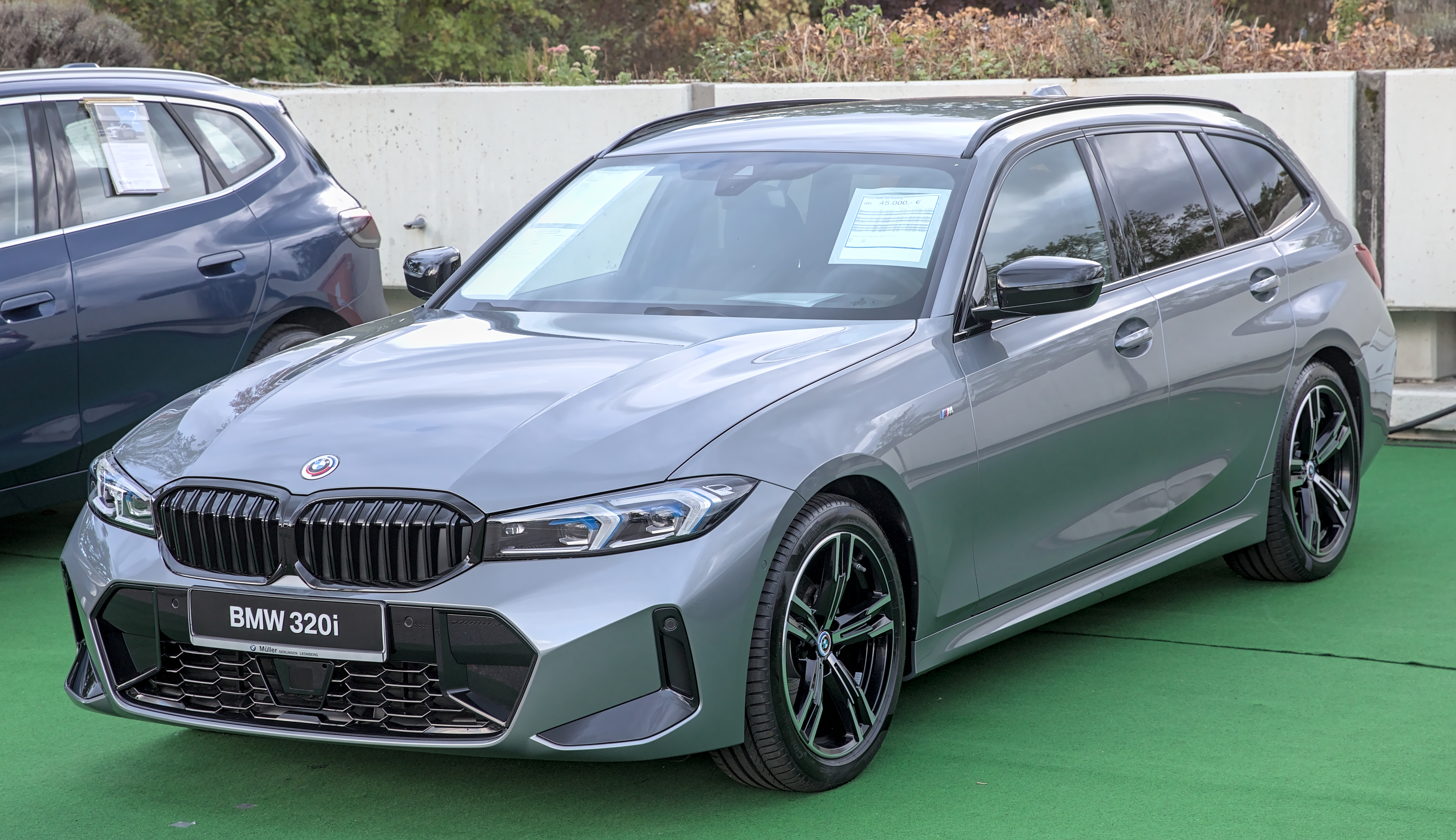
G21 BMW 3 series M Sport (facelift)

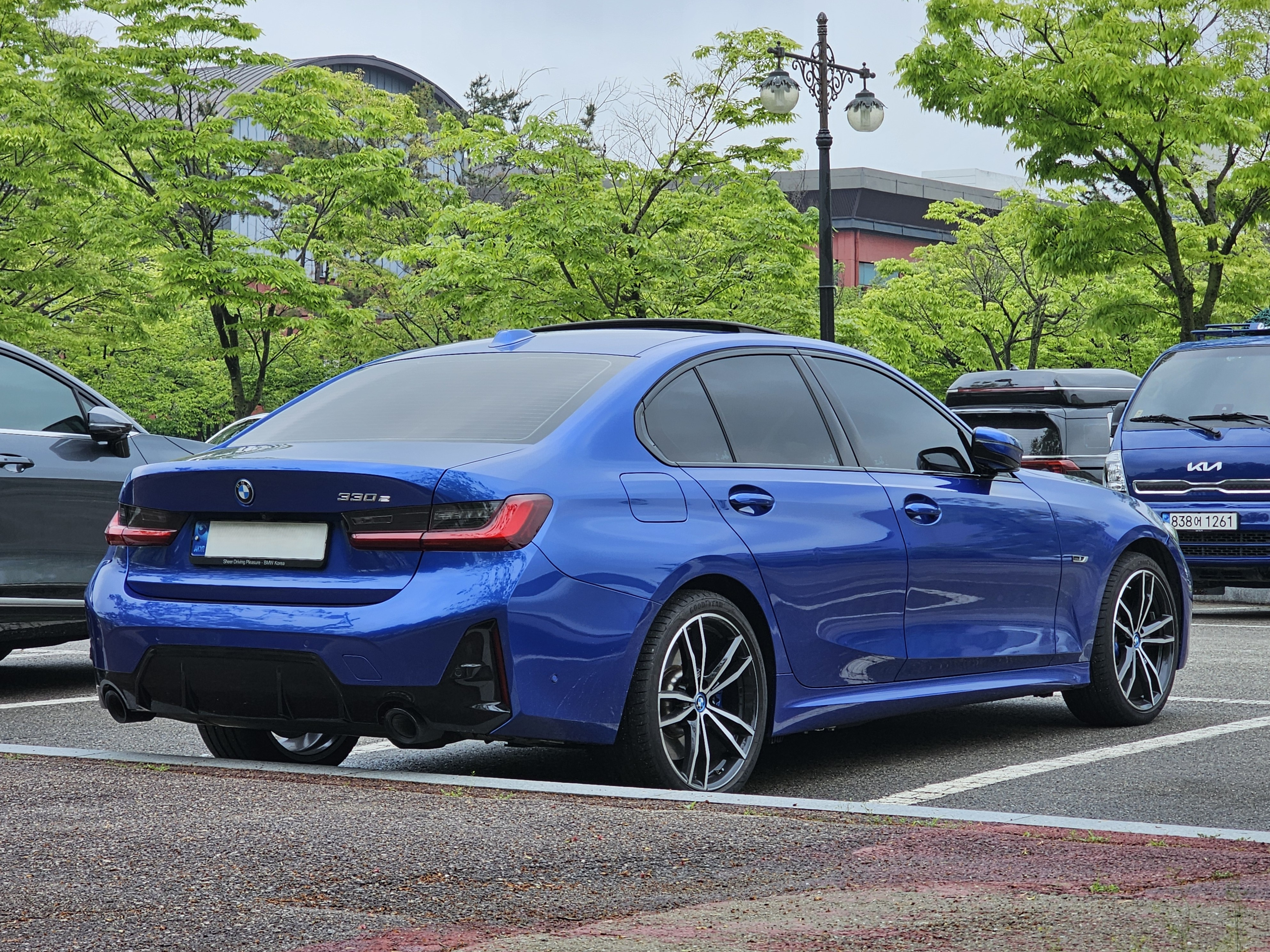
G20 BMW 3 series M Sport (facelift)

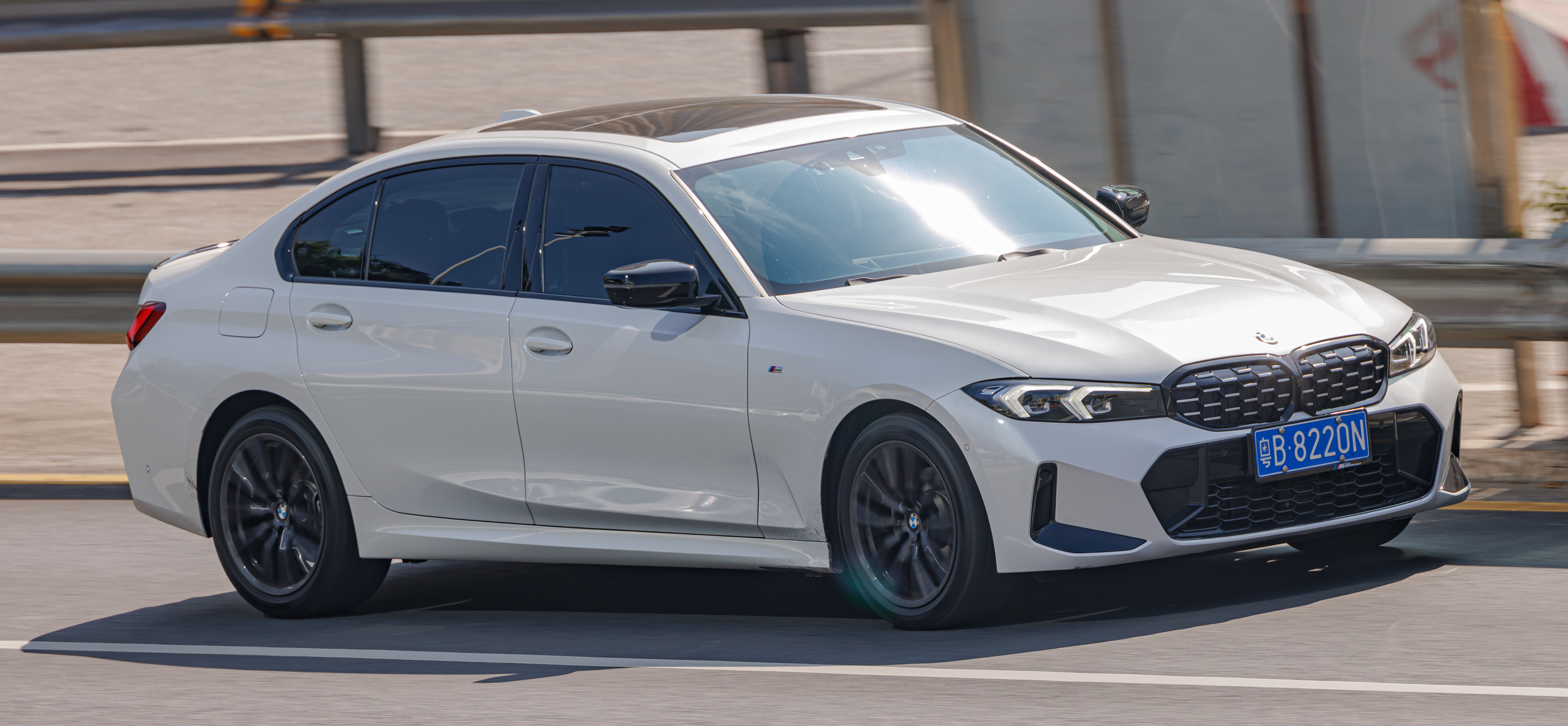
G28 BMW 3 series M Sport (facelift)

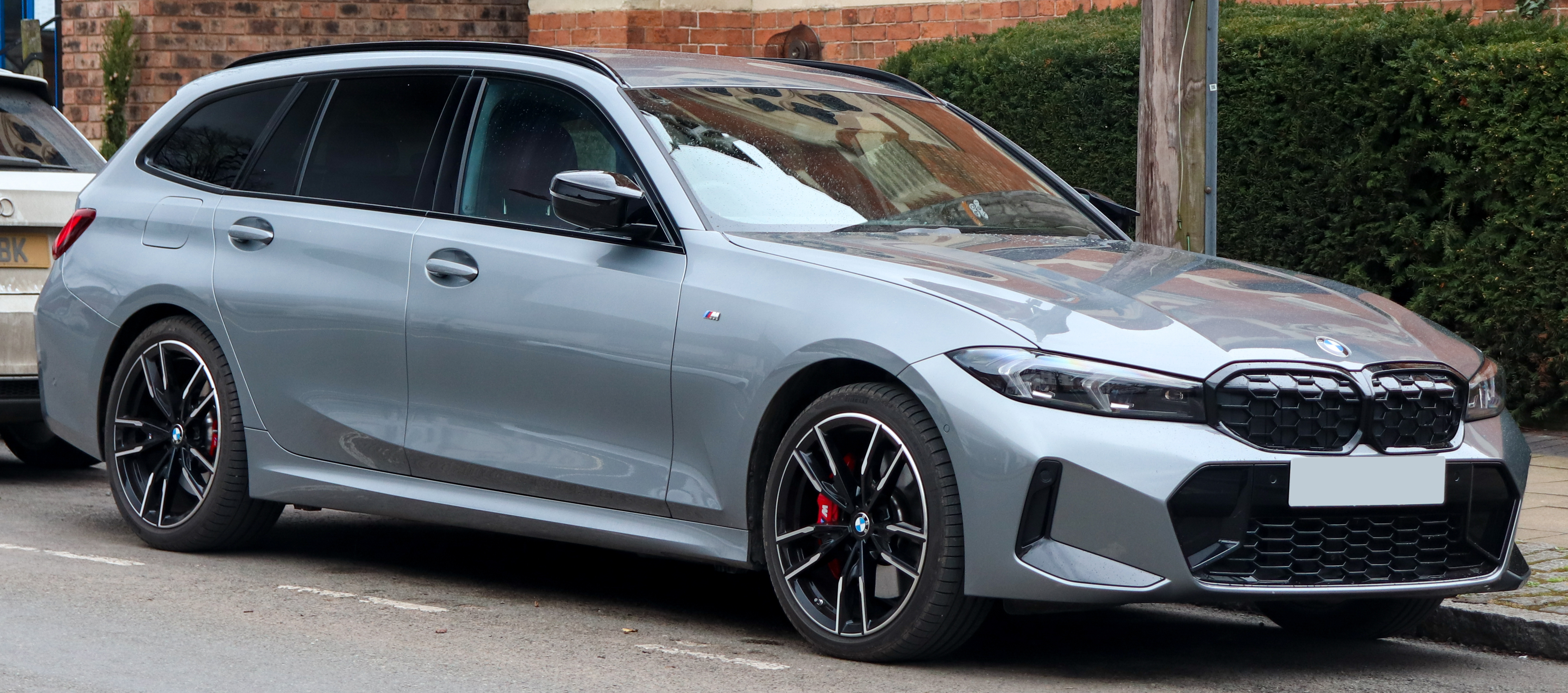
G21 BMW M340i xDrive (facelift)

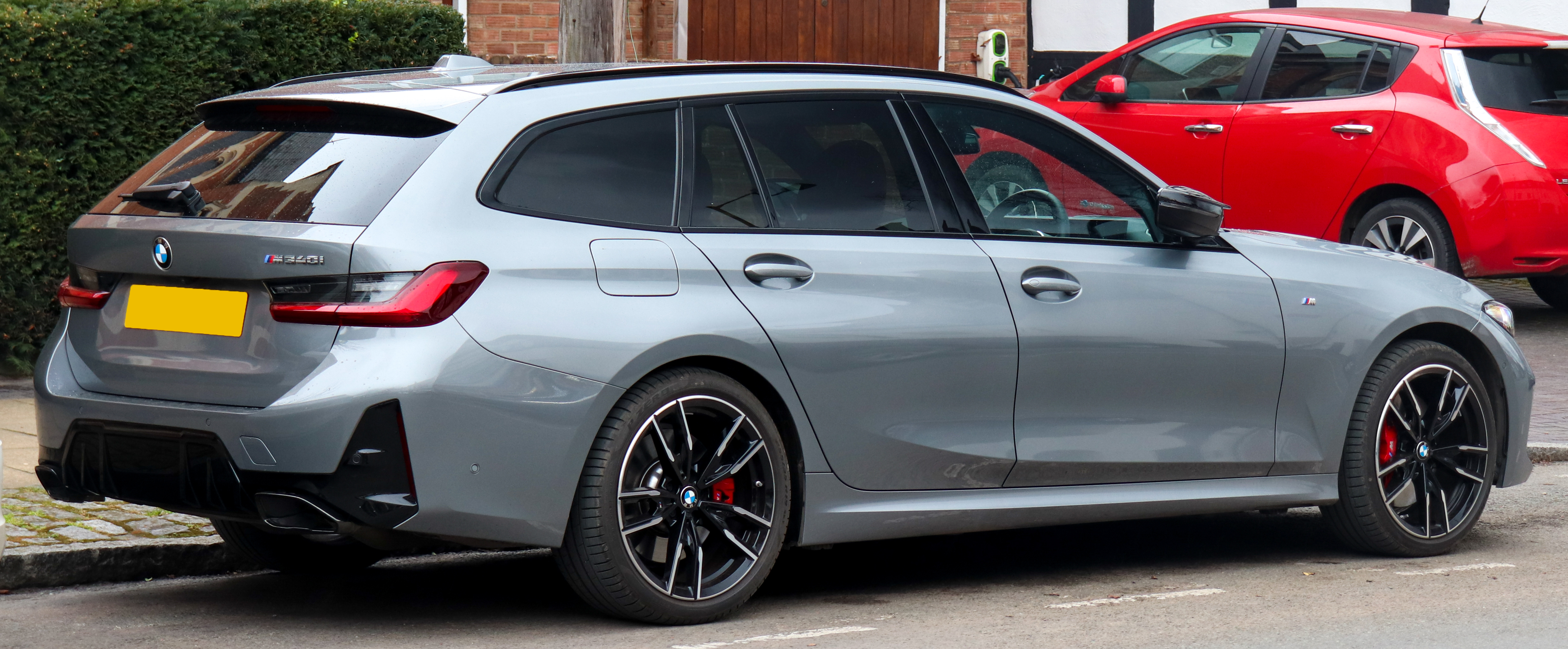
G21 BMW M340i xDrive (facelift)

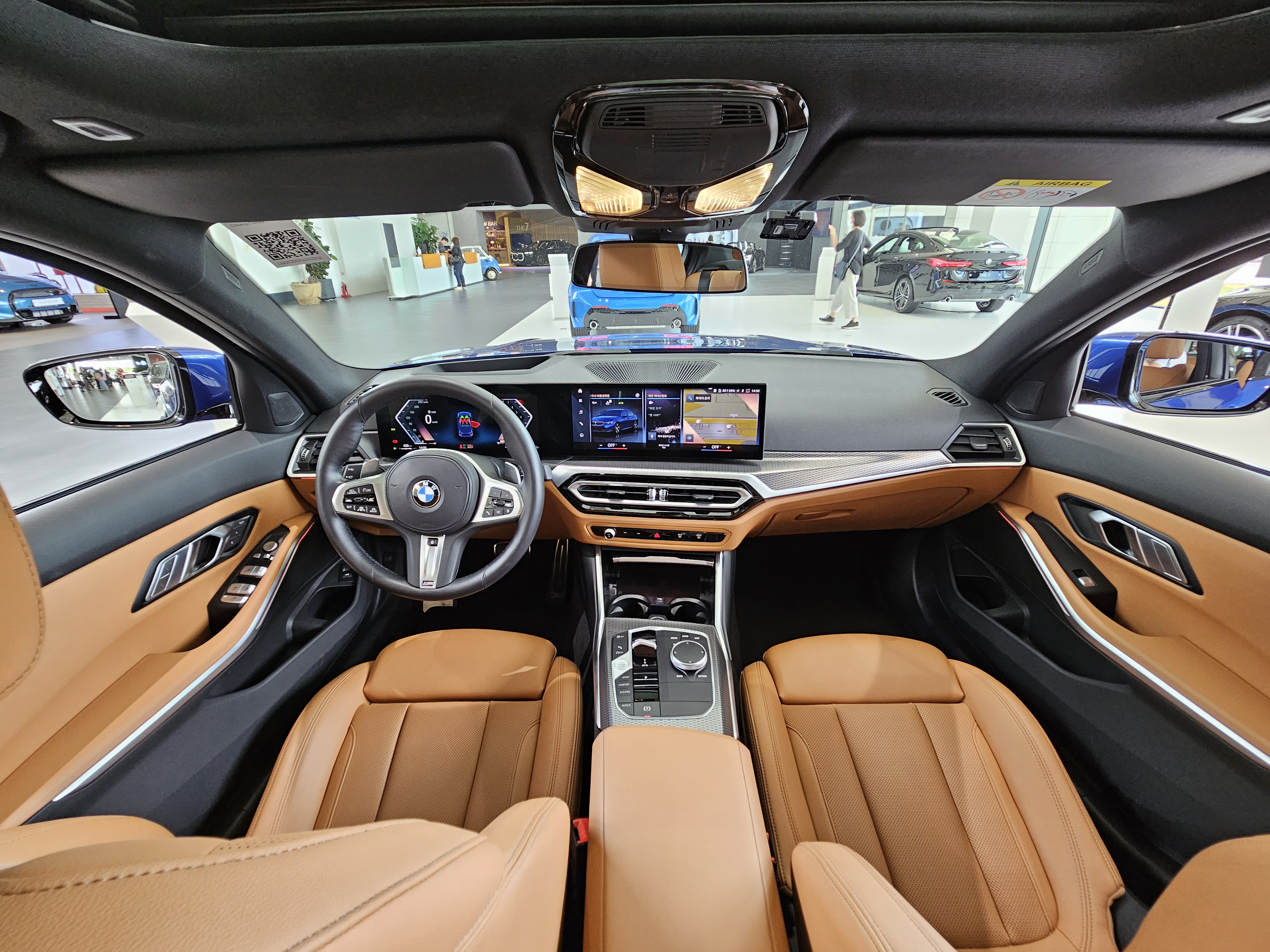
Interior (facelift)

== Engines ==
=== Petrol engines ===
Model	Years	Engine	Power	Torque	0–100 km/h (62 mph) (Note: Legend: RWD [AWD] for sedan version. Automatic Transmission.)
318i / 320Li	2020–	2.0 L B48; I4 turbo	115 kW (156 PS; 154 hp) at 4,500–6,500 rpm	250 N⋅m (184 lb⋅ft) at 1,300–4,300 rpm	8.4 seconds
320i / 325Li	2019–	2.0 L B48; I4 turbo	135 kW (184 PS; 181 hp) at 5,000–6,500 rpm	300 N⋅m (221 lb⋅ft) at 1,350–4,000 rpm	7.2 [7.6] seconds
320i (Note: Turkish and Tunisian markets)	2019–	1.6 L B48 I4 turbo	125 kW (170 PS; 168 hp) at 5,000–6,000 rpm	250 N⋅m (184 lb⋅ft) at 2,000–4,700 rpm	7.7 seconds
320e	2021–	2.0 L B48 I4 turbo + electric motor	150 kW (204 PS; 201 hp) at 5,000–6,500 rpm	350 N⋅m (258 lb⋅ft) at 1,450–3,700 rpm	7 seconds
330e	2019–	2.0 L B48 I4 turbo + electric motor	215 kW (292 PS; 288 hp)	420 N⋅m (310 lb⋅ft)	5.9 seconds
330i / 330Li	2019–	2.0 L B48; I4 turbo	190 kW (258 PS; 255 hp) at 5,000–6,500 rpm	400 N⋅m (295 lb⋅ft) at 1,550–4,400 rpm	5.8 [5.5] seconds
M340i	2019–	3.0 L B58 (Note: The B58 engine was named Ward's 10 Best Engines in 2016, 2017, 2019 and 2020.); I6 turbo	285 kW (387 PS; 382 hp) at 5,800–6,500 rpm	500 N⋅m (369 lb⋅ft) at 1,800–5,000 rpm	4.6 seconds
Alpina B3	2019–	3.0 L S58; I6 turbo	344 kW (468 PS; 461 hp) at 5,500–7,000 rpm	700 N⋅m (516 lb⋅ft) at 2,500–4,500 rpm	4.2 seconds

In 2023, tests by the Graz University of Technology found that the plug-in hybrid version of the car (along with several other plug-in hybrids) emits more than three times as much carbon dioxide per kilometre as the results from the mandated government laboratory test procedures indicate, with 112 grammes released per kilometre travelled in the universities on-road test as opposed to the official claim of 36 grammes released per kilometres travelled.

=== Diesel engines ===
Model	Years	Engine	Power	Torque	0–100 km/h (62 mph) (Note: Legend: RWD, [AWD] for sedan version. Automatic Transmission.)
316d	2019–2024	2.0 L B47; I4 turbo	90 kW (122 PS; 120 hp) at 4000 rpm	300 N·m (221 lb·ft) at 1,500-3,000 rpm	9.8 seconds
318d	2019–	2.0 L B47; I4 turbo	110 kW (150 PS; 148 hp) at 4,000 rpm	320 N⋅m (236 lb⋅ft) at 1,500–3,000 rpm	8.2 seconds (Note: Manual Transmission: 8.4 seconds.)
320d / 320Ld (Note: Indian market.)	2019–	2.0 L B47; I4 turbo	140 kW (190 PS; 188 hp) at 4,000 rpm	400 N⋅m (295 lb⋅ft) at 1,750–2,500 rpm	6.8 [6.9] seconds (Note: Manual Transmission: 7.1 seconds.)
330d	2019–2020	3.0 L B57; I6 turbo	195 kW (265 PS; 261 hp) at 4,000 rpm	580 N⋅m (428 lb⋅ft) at 1,750–2,750 rpm	5.2 seconds
330d	2020–	3.0 L B57; I6 turbo MHEV	210 kW (286 PS; 282 hp) at 4,000 rpm Starter motor / generator: 8 kW; 11 PS (11 hp)	650 N⋅m (479 lb⋅ft) at 1,500–2,500 rpm Starter motor / generator: 25 N⋅m (2.55 kg⋅m; 18.4 lb⋅ft)	5.3 [5.0] seconds
M340d	2020–	3.0 L B57; I6 twin-turbo	250 kW (340 PS; 335 hp) at 4,400 rpm	700 N⋅m (516 lb⋅ft) at 1,750–2,250 rpm	4.6 seconds
Alpina D3 S	2020–	3.0 L B57; I6 twin-turbo	261 kW (355 PS; 350 hp) at 4,000–4,200 rpm	730 N⋅m (538 lb⋅ft) at 1,750–2,750 rpm	3.9 seconds

== BMW i3 (G28 BEV) ==
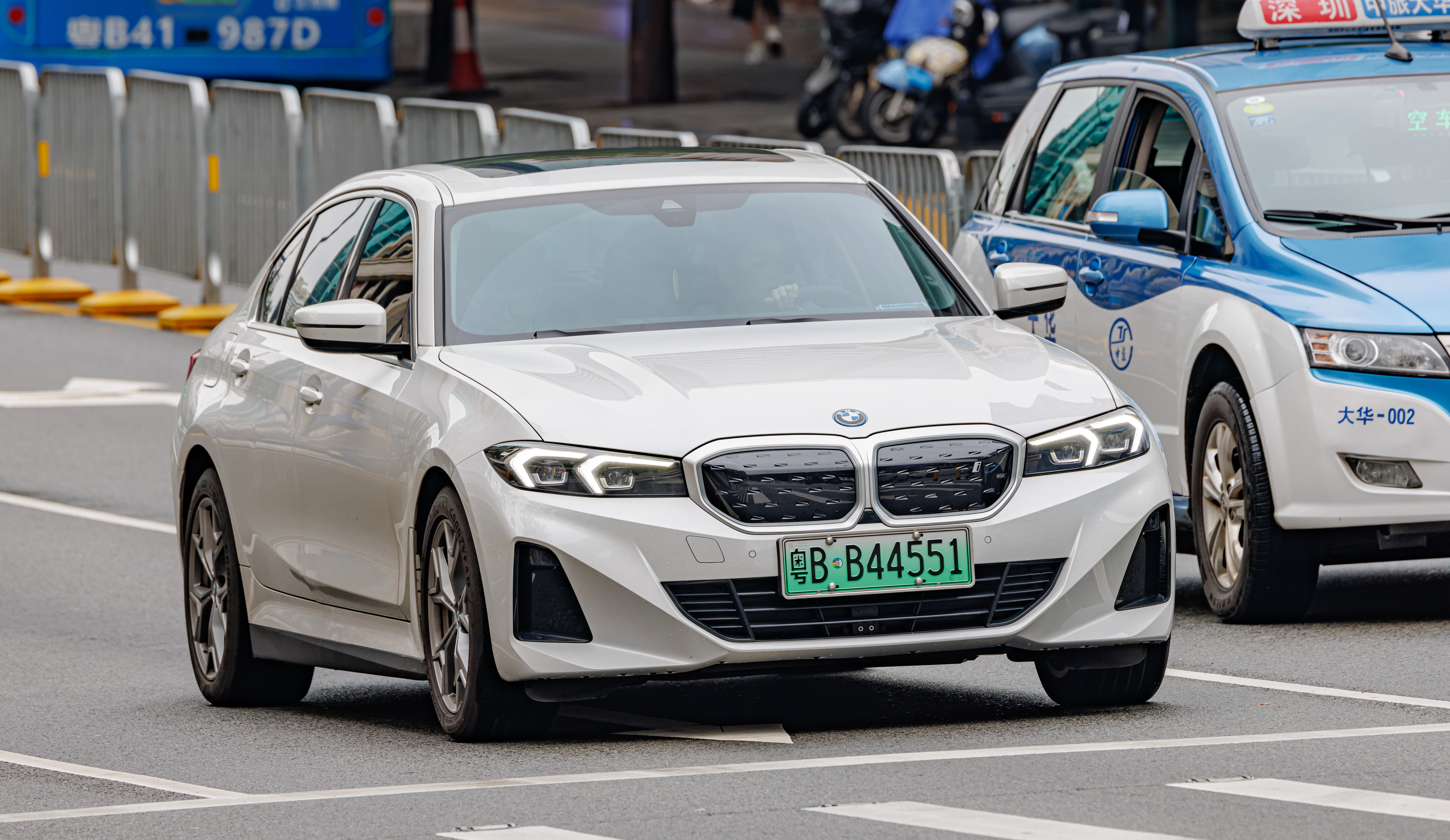
BMW i3 eDrive35L

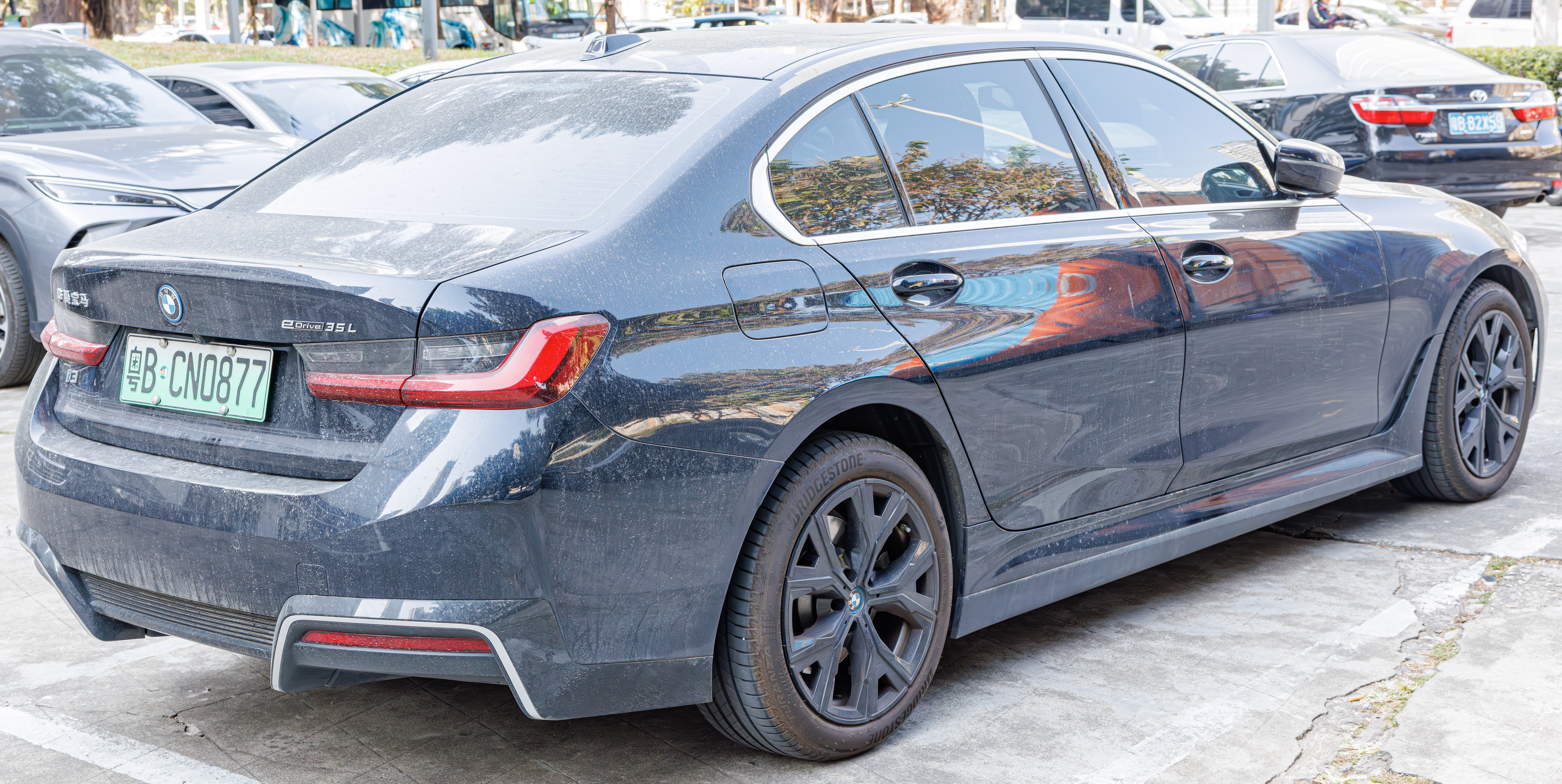
BMW i3 eDrive35L rear view

The BMW i3 sedan (model code G28 BEV) is a battery electric version of the long-wheelbase 3 Series (G28), and reused the nameplate from the i3 hatchback. It is assembled at the BMW Brilliance plant in Lydia, Shenyang for the Chinese market. The i3 sedan was revealed in March 2022, essentially debuting the G20 facelift's styling.

The i3 eDrive35L introduced at launch is powered by a single rear electric motor offering 210 kW (282 hp) and 400 N⋅m (295 lb⋅ft), and a 0–100 km/h (0–62 mph) time of 6.2 seconds. It has a 70.3 kWh battery (66.1 kWh usable) that provides up to 526 km (327 mi) on the China light-duty vehicle test cycle (CLTC). Part of the BMW i sub-brand, the i3 sedan features the Gen5 eDrive powertrain components used by the iX3, i4 and iX, and the BMW OS8 operating system. Supported for 95 kW DC fast charging, the i3 sedan can be charged from 10 to 80 per cent in 35 minutes or 97 kilometres (60 mi) in 10 minutes. Using AC, the battery pack is charged at 11 kW. It has 410 litres (14 cu ft) of boot space, 70 L (2.5 cu ft) smaller than in a conventional 3 Series.

A more expensive variant, called the eDrive40L, was introduced in February 2023. It features the same rear electric motor as the BMW i4 eDrive40 that reaches 250 kW (335 hp) and 430 N⋅m (317 lb⋅ft), a 0–100 km/h (0–62 mph) time of 5.6 seconds, and a range of 592 km (368 mi) (CLTC).

== M3 ==
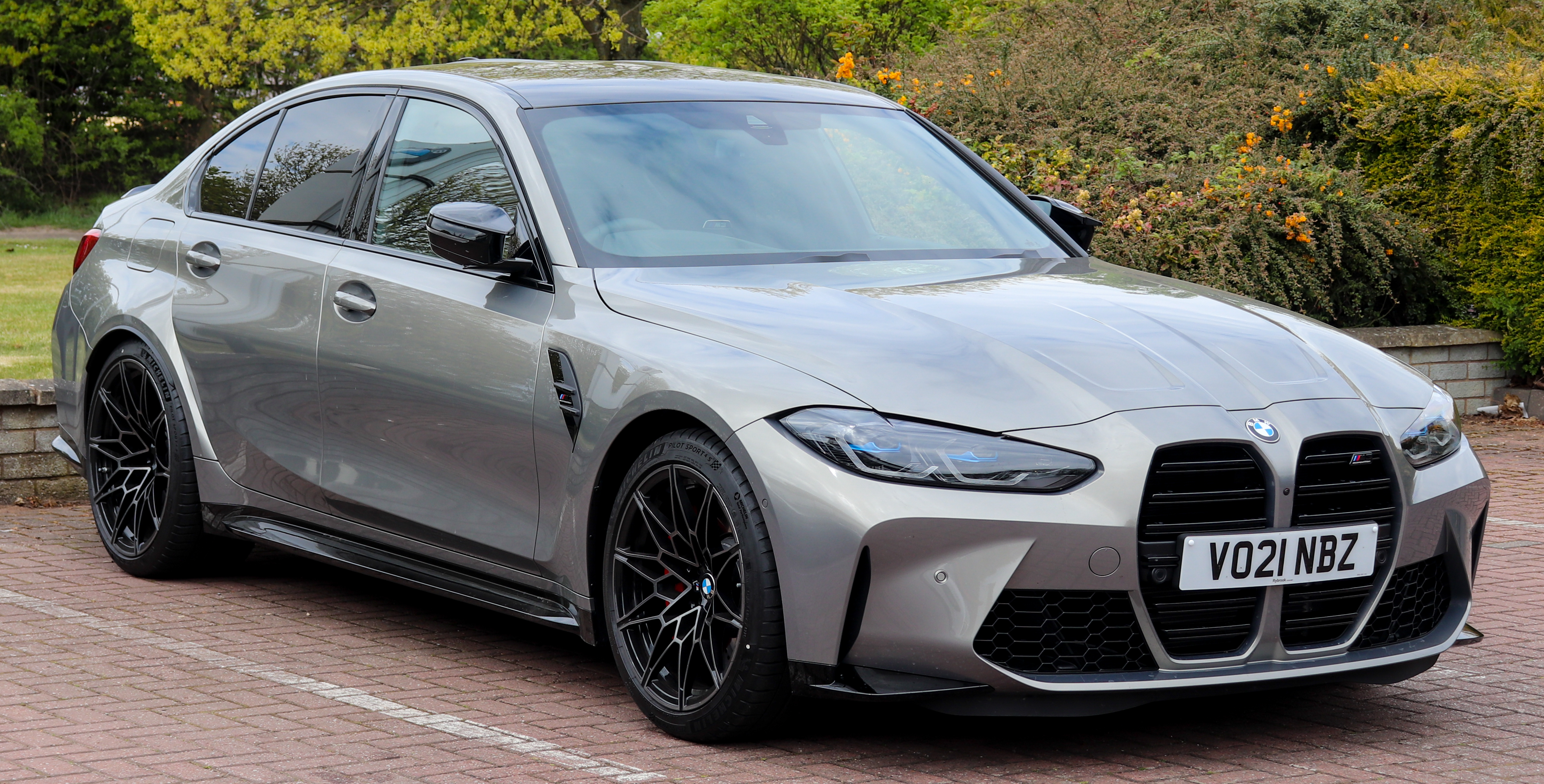
G80 BMW M3

The M3 model was released in 2021. All-wheel drive (xDrive) is optional on the G80 M3, making it the first time that a M3 has not exclusively used a rear-wheel drive layout. A manual transmission is only available on rear-wheel drive models.

BMW announced the launch of the first-ever M3 Touring in June 2022. Codenamed G81, it will be available along the sedan G80, the coupé M4 G82 and convertible M4 G83.

The M3 is powered by the 3.0 L (183 cu in) BMW S58 straight-six engine that debuted in the G01 X3 M.

== Alpina B3 and D3 ==
The sixth generation of Alpina B3 was introduced first as a Touring at the Frankfurt Motor Show in September 2019, followed by the sedan version later in October at the Tokyo Motor Show. The car is powered by the same S58 straight-six petrol engine as the G80/81 M3, but tuned to produce 344 kW (468 PS; 461 hp) and 700 N⋅m (516 lb⋅ft). It is only mated to a 8-speed automatic transmission and all-wheel drive system as standard. The handling is also reworked with a wider track, high performance tyres, stiffer springs, adaptive dampers, larger-diameter disc brakes and four-piston calipers.

The third generation diesel powered version, called D3 S, was launched in May 2020. Based on the M340d xDrive model, the engine was tuned to produce 261 kW (355 PS; 350 hp) and 730 N⋅m (538 lb⋅ft). It is also received the same appearance and handling revision as the B3.

The facelift model was introduced in May 2022, received the similar appearance and equipment as the facelift G20 3 series. For the B3, the S58 engine power was raised to produce 364 kW (495 PS; 488 hp) and 730 N⋅m (538 lb⋅ft), more than the standard BMW M3.

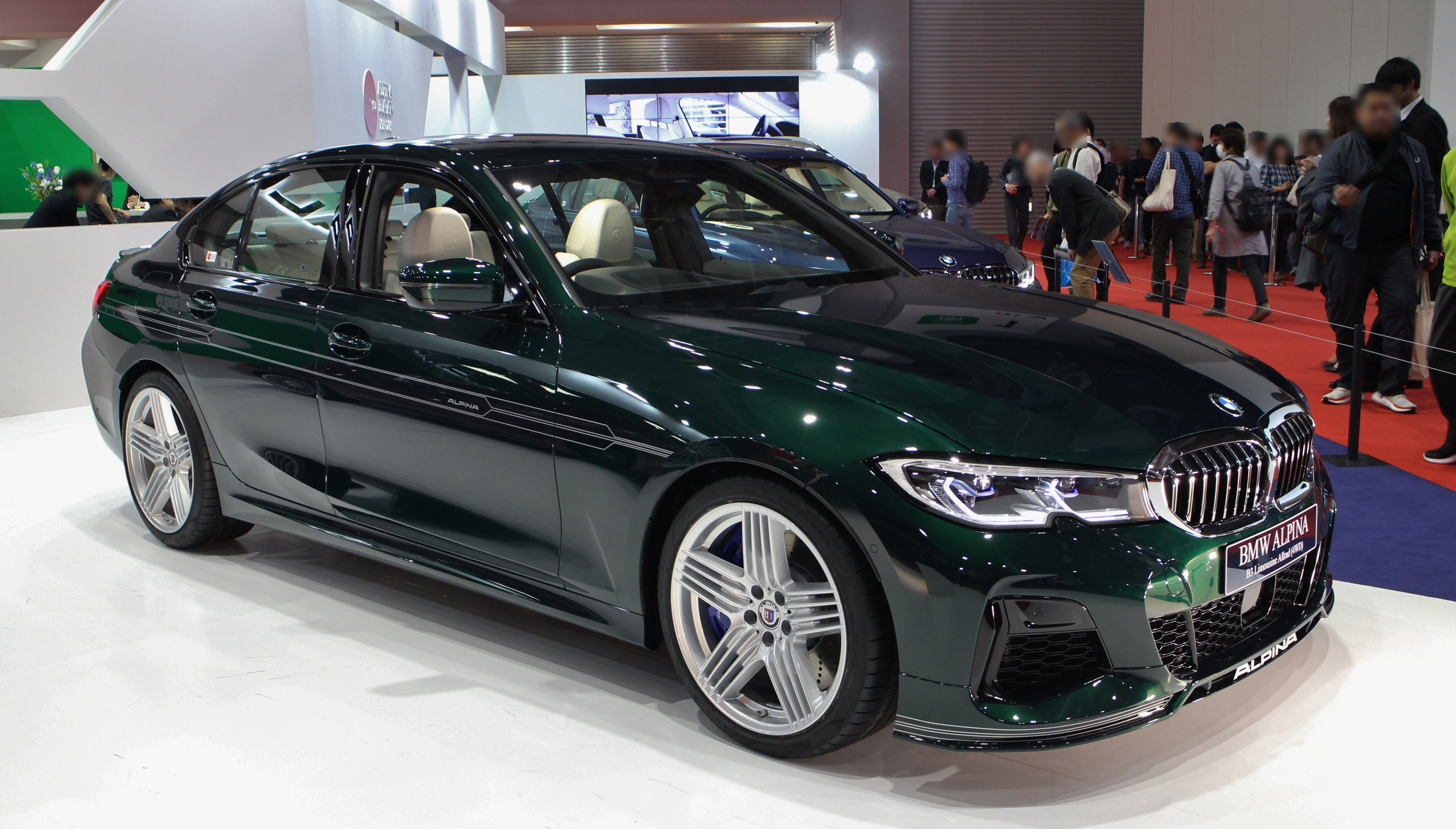
Alpina B3 sedan (pre-facelift)

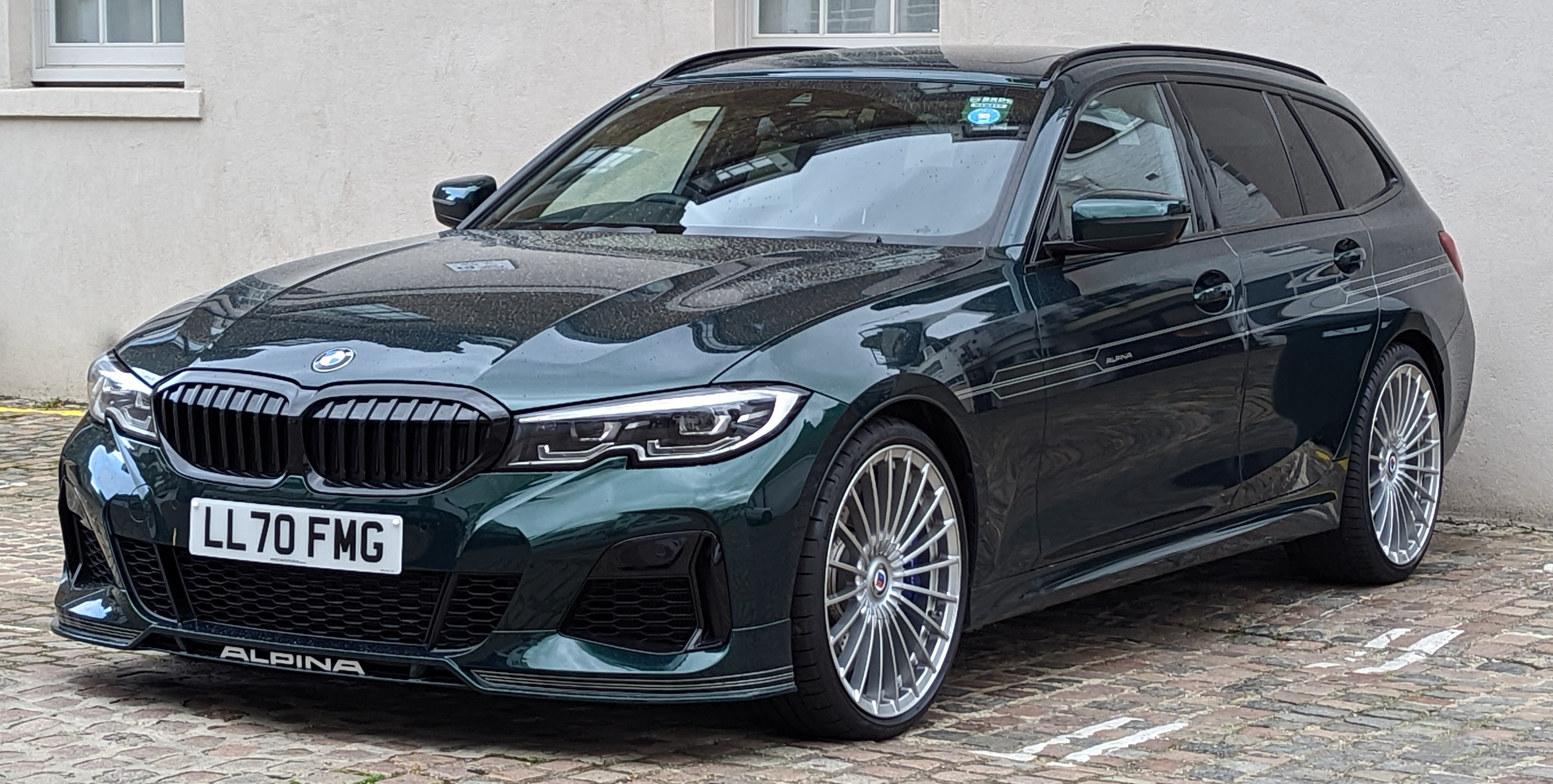
Alpina B3 Touring (pre-facelift)

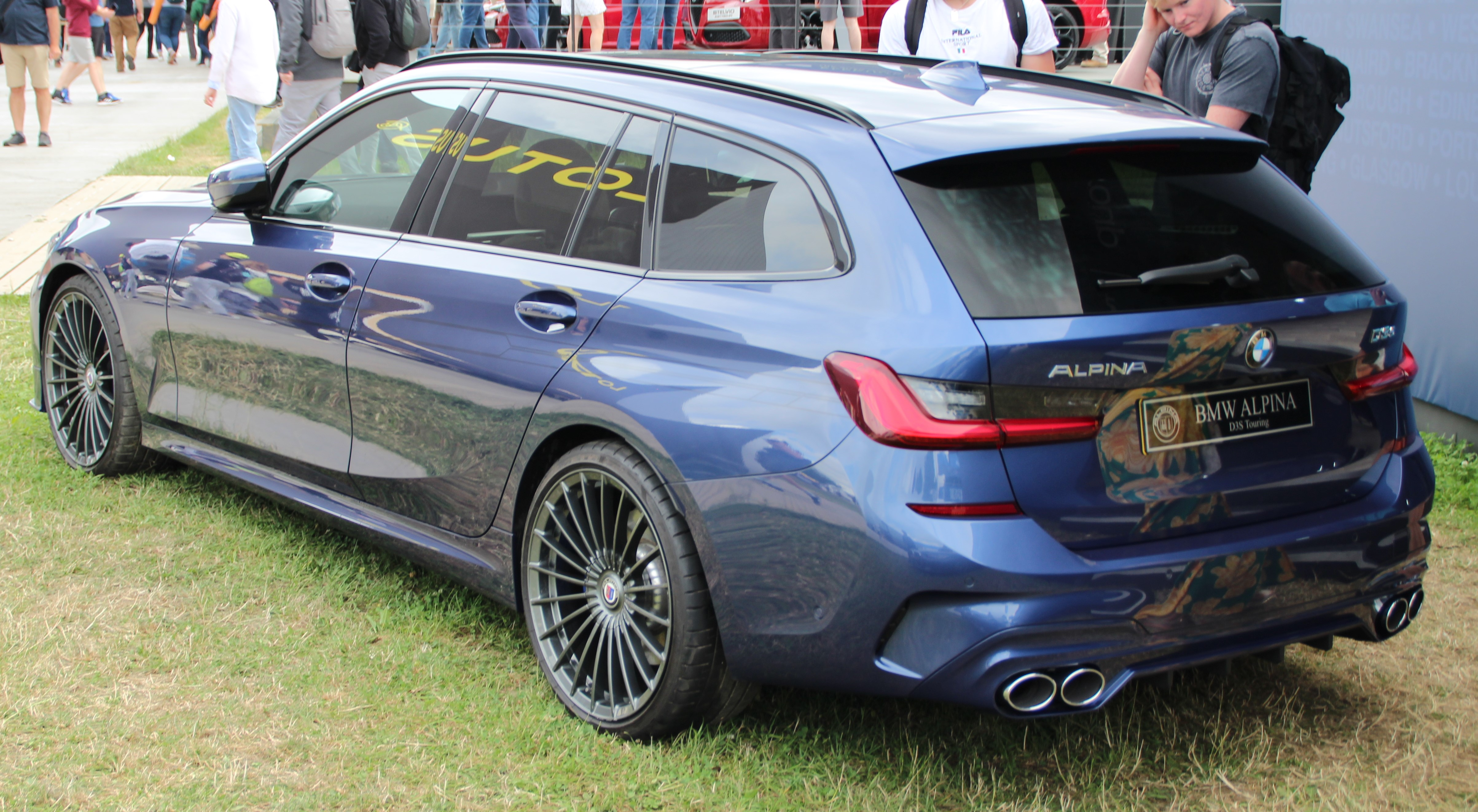
Rear view of Alpina D3 S

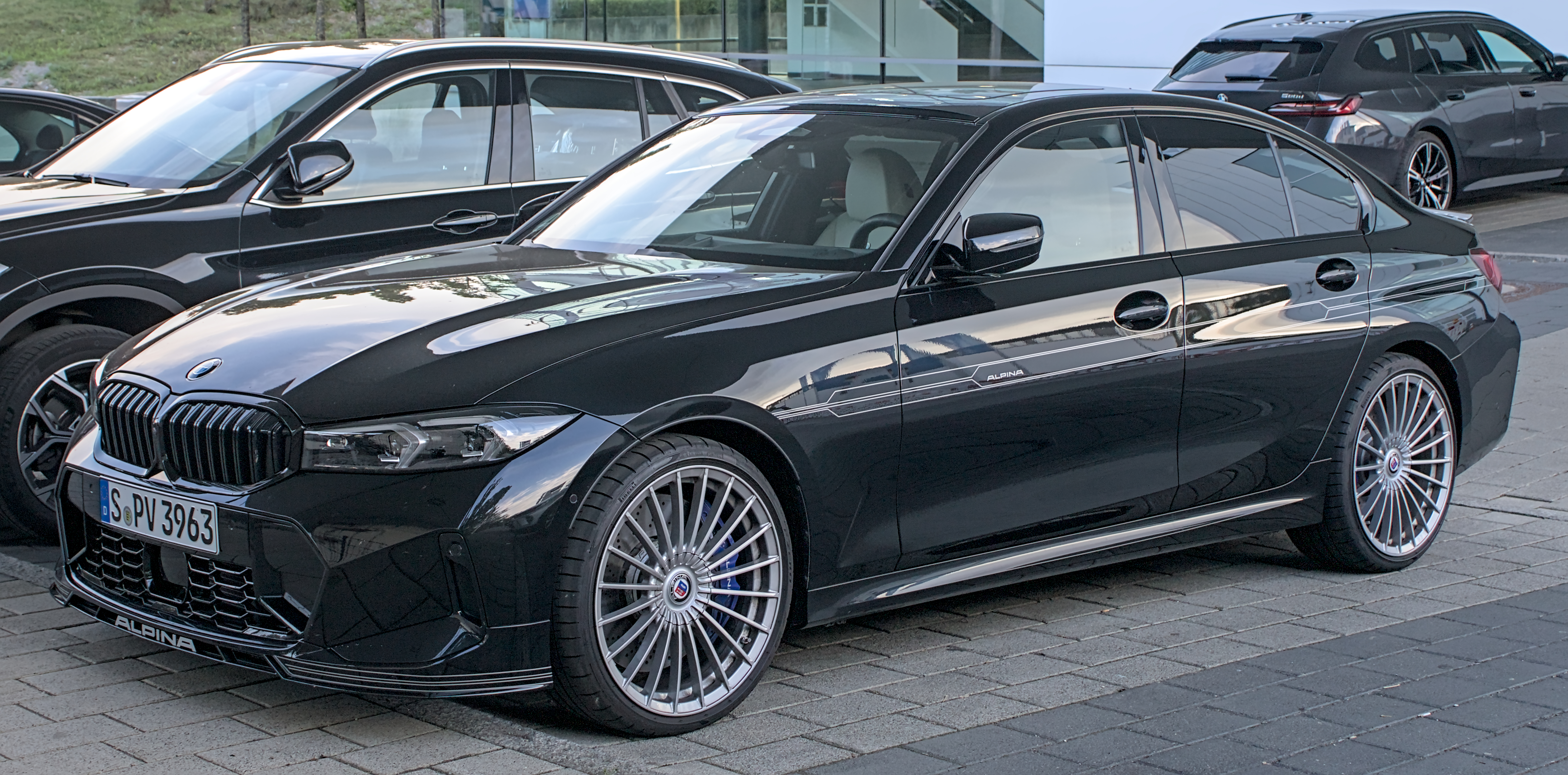
Alpina B3 (facelift)

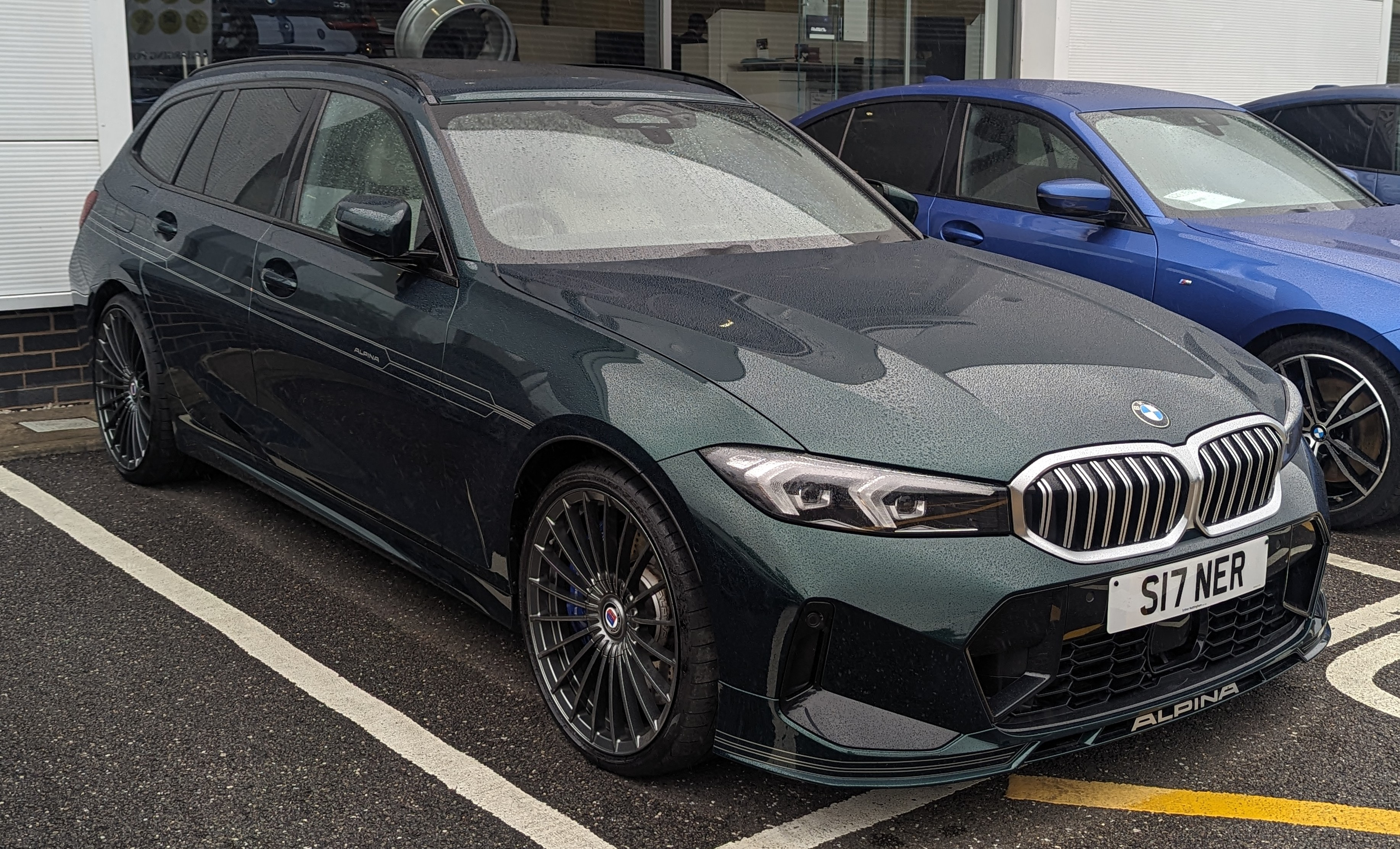
Alpina B3 Touring (facelift)

== Safety ==
=== ANCAP ===
ANCAP test results* BMW 3 Series 2.0L variants (2019, aligned with Euro NCAP)
Test	Points	%
Overall:	5 /5 stars	
Adult occupant:	37	97%
Child occupant:	43	88%
Pedestrian:	42	87%
Safety assist:	10.1	77%

=== Euro NCAP ===
The 2019 3 Series scored five stars overall in its Euro NCAP test.

Euro NCAP test results* BMW 320d, LHD (2019)
Test	Points	%
Overall:	5 /5 stars	
Adult occupant:	37.1	97%
Child occupant:	42.8	87%
Pedestrian:	42	87%
Safety assist:	10	76%

=== IIHS ===
The 2022 BMW 3 Series was tested by the IIHS and its top trim received a Top Safety Pick award:

IIHS scores
Small overlap front (Driver)	Good	
Small overlap front (Passenger)	Good	
Moderate overlap front	Good	
Side (original test)	Good	
Roof strength	Good	
Head restraints and seats	Good	
Headlights	Good / Poor	varies by trim/option
Front crash prevention (Vehicle-to-Vehicle)	Superior	optional
Front crash prevention (Vehicle-to-Vehicle)	Superior	standard
Front crash prevention (Vehicle-to-Pedestrian, day)	Advanced	optional
Front crash prevention (Vehicle-to-Pedestrian, day)	Superior	standard
Child seat anchors (LATCH) ease of use	Good	

== Awards ==
- 2018 Auto Bild Allrad "AWD Car of the Year up to €40,000" award
- 2018 Auto Zeitung "World's Best Car" in the midsize category
- 2018 Car Magazine "Best Buys" in the premium midsize category
- 2019 What Car? "Best Executive Car" award
- 2019 Car Sales "Car of the Year" award
