= Mistral Engines =

Swiss manufacturing company

Mistral Engines SA was a Swiss developer and manufacturer of wankel rotary aviation light aircraft, helicopter and unmanned military vehicle engines based on Mazda automotive engines. Its headquarters was in Geneva, Switzerland and was majority owned by DEA General Aviation, a Chinese company based in Guangdong. A wholly owned subsidiary company was headquartered in DeLand, Florida.

== History ==
Mistral Engines formed in 2001 in Switzerland with the purpose of developing engines for light aircraft and helicopters.

The CEO of Mistral Engines was Phillippe Durr, and in March 2010, Ana Fontes became the company’s Marketing and Americas Sales Director.

In March 2010, Mistral announced that it had made significant progress toward the FAA certification of its new 300 horsepower, G-300 engine, but on 9 June, due to lack of financial support from investors, Mistral had to cease the development and certification of its G-300 engine.

Heli Air Design, a helicopter manufacturer from France, used the Mistral G200 rotary engine for its two seat ultralight helicopter Helineo, which was launched in 2012.

In 2012 Mazda stopped production of its Wankel powered car, the RX-8.

In 2014, Mistral Engines was acquired by Chinese company Elecpro for €2,5 million. In 2015 Elecpro changed its name to DEA General Aviation. The acquisition was originally intended to exclude drone dual-use technology, meaning military and civilian use, but was eventually included. According to the Dutch OSINT platform Datenna, DEA General Aviation has no government related shareholders.

Mistral Engines went into bankruptcy, but it was revoked in 2019 by the President of the Court of the District of La Côte and the company was reinstated. The company once again filed for bankruptcy and was liquidated in 2022 and terminated in 2024.

== Product line ==
- Mistral G-190
- Mistral G-230-TS
- Mistral G-360-TS
- Mistral G-300 - a three-rotor wankel engine rated at 300 hp (224 kW) in normally aspirated configuration and at 360 hp (269 kW) with optional turbocharging
- Mistral K-300 - similar to the G-300 but configured to use kerosene (jet fuel) instead of gasoline
- Mistral G-200 - a two-rotor wankel engine rated at 200 hp (149 kW) in normally aspirated configuration and at 230 hp (172 kW) with optional turbocharging
- Mistral K-200 - similar to the G-200 but configured to use kerosene (jet fuel) instead of gasoline
