= Giles G-202 =

Aerobatic plane designed by Richard Giles

G-202
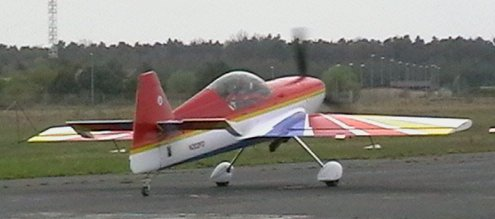

General information
- Type: aerobatic aircraft
- Manufacturer: AkroTech Aviation; Avions Mudry
- Designer: Richard Giles
- Number built: At least 26

History
- First flight: 1995
- Developed from: Giles G-200

The Giles G-202 is an unlimited-level aerobatic airplane designed by Richard Giles.

This carbon fiber composite monoplane was manufactured by AkroTech Aviation in Troutdale, Oregon. The tandem two-seater was based upon the single-seater Giles G-200.

The G-202 was produced and sold as kit plane by AkroTech, and slightly modified as the CAP 222 by Avions Mudry (France).

== Operational history ==
- In 1999 airshow performer Wayne Handley broke the world record for the most consecutive flat spins in a Giles G-202 performing 78 spins. The record was broken in 2014 by Spencer Suderman in 2014 in a Pitts S2-B performing 81 spins from 23,000 ft altitude.
- A Giles 202 crashed on Friday 28 August 2015 during practice for an air show at Stewart International Airport near New Windsor, NY, about 60 miles north of New York City. Photos taken by a bystander show the tail separating from the aircraft as the pilot was in an ascending manoeuver. The pilot was killed.
- A Giles 202 crashed on Thursday 30 May 2019 during takeoff at the Wasilla Airport near Wasilla, AK. The pilot was killed. NTSB is still investigating the crash.
- A Giles 202 crashed on Saturday 29 October 2022 during a normal flight near Ulm, Germany. Two occupants died.

== Specifications (G-202) ==
Data from

General characteristics

- Crew: one or two pilots
- Length: 5.89 m (19 ft 4 in)
- Wingspan: 6.71 m (22 ft 0 in)
- Height: 1.70 m (5 ft 7 in)
- Empty weight: 450–500 kg (992–1,102 lb)
- Max takeoff weight: 726 kg (1,600 lb) cruise; 640 kg (1,400 lb) max aerobatic weight; 1,200 lb (540 kg) max weight for competition aerobatics
- Powerplant: 1 × Lycoming AEIO-360-A1E piston engine, 175 kW (235 hp)

Performance

- Cruise speed: 259 km/h (161 mph, 140 kn)
- Stall speed: 107 km/h (66 mph, 58 kn)
- Never exceed speed: 415 km/h (258 mph, 220 kn) - higher values according to other sources
- Fuel capacity (cruise): cruise: 219.5 L (58 gal); aerobatics: 37.8 L (10 gal)
- Fuel consumption: about 40-60 L/h
- G-loads: +/-10g
- Roll rate: >420°/s
