= Mistral G-230-TS =

G-230-TS
- Type: Aircraft engine
- National origin: Switzerland
- Manufacturer: Mistral Engines

The Mistral G-230-TS is a Swiss aircraft engine, designed and produced by Mistral Engines of Geneva for use in light aircraft.

By March 2018 the engine was no longer advertised on the company website and seems to be out of production.

== Design and development ==
The engine is a twin-rotor, 2X3X654 cc (39.9 cu in) displacement, liquid-cooled, gasoline Wankel engine design, with a mechanical gearbox reduction drive with a reduction ratio of 2.8:1. It employs dual electronic ignition systems and produces 230 hp (172 kW) at 2515 rpm.

== Specifications (G-230-TS) ==
Data from Tacke

=== General characteristics ===
- Type: Twin-rotor Wankel aircraft engine
- Displacement: 2X3X654 cc (39.9 cu in)
- Dry weight: 149 kg (328.5 lb)

=== Components ===
- Fuel type: gasoline
- Cooling system: liquid
- Reduction gear: mechanical gearbox

=== Performance ===
- Power output: 230 hp (172 kW)

== See also ==
Related lists

- List of aircraft engines
