= G20 (disambiguation) =

The G20 is an international group of 20 major economies. The term is also used to refer to any of the G20 summits.

G20 may also refer to:

- G20 developing nations, a trade negotiations bloc
- G20 (film), an American action thriller film
- G20 Research Group at University of Toronto
- BMW 3 Series (G20)
- G20 (inch units) command in G-code
- G20 version of the Infiniti G-series (Q40/Q60) car
- G20 version of the Chevrolet Van
- G20 model of car manufactured by Ginetta Cars
- Ginetta Junior Championship, in motor racing, formerly G20 Cup
- G20 Schools, an association
- County Route G20 (California)
- G20 Qingdao–Yinchuan Expressway, in China
- Bendix G-20, a computer
- Gribovsky G-20 USSR aircraft in mid-1930s
- Grumman JF Duck G-20, amphibious biplane
- Maryhill, Glasgow, Scotland, postcode
- Chase XG-20, a US transport glider prototype
