= Mistral G-360-TS =

Swiss aircraft engine made by Mistral Engines of Geneva

G-360-TS
- Type: Aircraft engine
- National origin: Switzerland
- Manufacturer: Mistral Engines

The Mistral G-360-TS is a Swiss aircraft engine, designed and produced by Mistral Engines of Geneva for use in light aircraft.

By March 2018 the engine was no longer advertised on the company website and seems to be out of production.

== Design and development ==
The engine is a three-rotor, 3X3X654 cc (39.9 cu in) displacement, liquid-cooled, gasoline Wankel engine design, with a mechanical gearbox reduction drive with a reduction ratio of 2.82:1. It employs dual electronic ignition systems and produces 360 hp (268 kW) at 2250 rpm.

== Specifications (G-360-TS) ==
Data from Tacke

=== General characteristics ===
- Type: Three-rotor Wankel aircraft engine
- Displacement: 3X3X654 cc (39.9 cu in)
- Dry weight: 190 kg (418.9 lb)

=== Components ===
- Fuel type: gasoline
- Cooling system: liquid
- Reduction gear: mechanical gearbox

=== Performance ===
- Power output: 360 hp (268 kW)

== See also ==
Related lists

- List of aircraft engines
