= Seaflight Shearwater =

- The proposed Shearwater 201 derivative

General information
- Type: Light amphibian
- Manufacturer: Seaflight (NZ)
- Designer: Bill Townson
- Primary user: Shearwater Aircraft Ltd.
- Number built: 1

History
- First flight: 2001

The Seaflight Shearwater is a light amphibian aircraft, designed in the 1990s. A single example was built by Seaflight (NZ) and was for a time owned by Shearwater Aviation, who promoted the design.

== History ==
The Shearwater Seaflight was designed by Bill Townson during the 1990s to fulfill a requirement for a four-seat amphibian. A series of 1/5th scale models were used to develop the design over a three-year period, with construction of a full-size machine beginning in 1997.

As ZK-SFA, the Shearwater was registered to Seaflight (NZ) Ltd of Warkworth, New Zealand and first flew in November 2001.

A second model, the Shearwater 201, was designed by Stephen Hoyle and Richard Roake. This was to be a next-generation 4 seat amphibian without the typical "boat hull" design amphibians use in an effort to reduce aerodynamic drag.

The aircraft subsequently changed hands and was re-registered several times, also appearing as ZK-TNZ owned by Shearwater Industries of Christchurch, then ZK-SFA again by Seaflight (NZ) and eventually to Shearwater Aircraft Ltd., based in Auckland. Shearwater Aircraft ceased trading in 2016, while the aircraft remains in private hands.

== Design ==
The Shearwater is an amphibious light aeroplane of mainly fibreglass construction. Seating for four is provided in an enclosed cabin, above and behind which is mounted a pusher powerplant. To accommodate the propeller, the rear fuselage is cut down with an indented vee shaped upper profile, which blends smoothly into a V-tail. The planing hull is stabilised in the water by wingtip floats, while a wheeled undercarriage is hinged on either side of the hull and retracts upward and backwards into the wing root attachment fairings. A nosewheel retracts forwards.

The straight, mid-mounted wings attach to the hull behind the cabin and underneath the engine, and are removable for land transport. Downturned wingtips are faired into the stabilising floats on the Shearwater Seaflight along with the typical "boat hull" most amphibians use.

The Shearwater was originally powered by a PZL-developed variant of a 210 hp Franklin type.

=== Shearwater 201 ===
The Shearwater 201 was proposed by Shearwater Aircraft as a next-generation kit, to become a certified aircraft at a later date. Differences between the 201 and the original model, or any amphibian, include the proposed use of a "hydroski" (a hydrofoil used to takeoff and land the aircraft in water) instead of a boat hull design. Engine options were to be either the Mistral G-300 Wankel type, mounted in pusher configuration, or a Price Induction Jet DGEN 390 jet engine. The kit was intended to have a construction time of 1000 man hours.

== Specifications ==
Note: Engine and performance data may relate to the Shearwater 201.

Data from Shearwater Aircraft

General characteristics

- Crew: 1
- Capacity: 3 passengers
- Length: 9.25 m (30 ft 4 in)
- Wingspan: 11 m (36 ft 1 in)
- Empty weight: 910 kg (2,006 lb)
- Gross weight: 1,482 kg (3,267 lb)
- Powerplant: 1 × Mistral G-300 (or Price DEGN 390 jet) Wankel engine, 220 kW (300 hp)

Performance

- Maximum speed: 456 km/h (283 mph, 246 kn)
- Cruise speed: 480 km/h (300 mph, 260 kn) 230 knots (260 mph) indicated at 8,000 feet (2,400 m)
- Stall speed: 107 km/h (66 mph, 58 kn)
- Range: 4,560 km (2,830 mi, 2,460 nmi) with 45 minute reserve
