= Giles G-200 =

American homebuilt aerobatic aircraft

G-200

General information
- Type: Homebuilt aircraft
- National origin: United States
- Manufacturer: AkroTech Aviation
- Status: Production completed
- Number built: at least 12

History
- First flight: May 26, 1996
- Variant: Giles G-202

The Giles G-200 is an American aerobatic homebuilt aircraft that was produced by AkroTech Aviation of Scappoose, Oregon. When it was available the aircraft was supplied as a complete ready-to-fly-aircraft or a kit for amateur construction. The first customer-built aircraft made its first flight on May 26, 1996. AkroTech Aviation went out of business and the design is no longer in production.

== Design and development ==
The G-200 features a cantilever low-wing, a single-seat enclosed cockpit under a bubble canopy, fixed conventional landing gear with wheel pants and a single engine in tractor configuration.

The aircraft is made from composites. Its 20.00 ft (6.1 m) span wing employs a Mort airfoil, has full-span ailerons but no flaps and a wing area of 75.00 sq ft (6.968 m^{2}). The cabin width is 23 in (58 cm) and has provisions for pilots from 61 in (150 cm) in height and 100 lb (45 kg) to 77 in (200 cm) and 245 lb (111 kg). When the aircraft was in production custom cockpit sizes were also available as options.

The G-200's acceptable installed power range is 150 to 220 hp (112 to 164 kW) and the standard engine used is the 200 hp (149 kW) Lycoming IO-360 powerplant.

The G-200 has an empty weight of 750 lb (340 kg) and a gross weight of 1,150 lb (520 kg), giving a useful load of 400 lb (180 kg). With full fuel of 36 U.S. gallons (140 L; 30 imp gal) the payload is 184 lb (83 kg).

The manufacturer estimates the construction time from the supplied quick-build kit as 1000 hours.

== Operational history ==
By 1998 the company reported that 26 kits had been sold and one aircraft was flying.

In December 2013 ten examples were registered in the United States with the Federal Aviation Administration, with a further two no longer registered. There was one G-200 registered with Transport Canada.

Pilot Mike Goulian described flying the G-200:

Some airplanes have a great roll rate, however they have very little centering feel in the middle. But this airplane does. You can do a roll at maximum aileron input from either high or low speed and the airplane still possesses a great centering feel. That's one of the greatest qualities you can have in an aerobatic plane.

== Specifications (G-200) ==
Data from AeroCrafter and The Incomplete Guide to Airfoil Usage

General characteristics

- Crew: one
- Length: 18 ft 0 in (5.49 m)
- Wingspan: 20 ft 0 in (6.10 m)
- Wing area: 75.00 sq ft (6.968 m^{2})
- Airfoil: Mort Airfoil
- Empty weight: 750 lb (340 kg)
- Gross weight: 1,150 lb (522 kg)
- Fuel capacity: 36 U.S. gallons (140 L; 30 imp gal)
- Powerplant: 1 × Lycoming IO-360 four cylinder, air-cooled, four stroke aircraft engine, 200 hp (150 kW)
- Propellers: 3-bladed constant speed propeller

Performance

- Maximum speed: 255 mph (410 km/h, 222 kn)
- Cruise speed: 215 mph (346 km/h, 187 kn)
- Stall speed: 66 mph (106 km/h, 57 kn)
- Range: 750 mi (1,210 km, 650 nmi)
- Rate of climb: 4,100 ft/min (21 m/s)
- Wing loading: 15.33 lb/sq ft (74.8 kg/m^{2})

== See also ==
- List of aerobatic aircraft
