= Mistral G-200 =

G-200
- Type: Aircraft engine
- National origin: Switzerland
- Manufacturer: Mistral Engines

The Mistral G-200 is a Swiss aircraft engine, designed and produced by Mistral Engines of Geneva for use in light aircraft.

== Design and development ==
The engine is a twin-rotor, 2X3X654 cc (39.9 cu in) displacement, liquid-cooled, gasoline Wankel engine design, with an integral mechanical gearbox reduction drive with a reduction ratio of 2.82:1. It employs dual electronic ignition systems and produces 150 hp (112 kW).

== Specifications (G-200) ==
Data from Tacke

=== General characteristics ===
- Type: Twin-rotor Wankel aircraft engine
- Displacement: 2X3X654 cc (39.9 cu in)
- Dry weight: 132 kg (291.0 lb)

=== Components ===
- Fuel type: gasoline
- Cooling system: liquid
- Reduction gear: integral mechanical gearbox

=== Performance ===
- Power output: 150 hp (112 kW)

== See also ==
Related lists

- List of aircraft engines
