= G2000 (disambiguation) =

G2000 may refer to:

- G2000, a clothing brand
- CZ-G2000, a handgun created by Arms Moravia
- Vossloh G2000, a diesel locomotive
- Garmin G2000 avionics system
