= AkroTech Aviation =

American aircraft manufacturer

- Company type: Privately held company
- Industry: Aerospace
- Defunct: after 1998
- Fate: Out of business
- Products: Kit aircraft

AkroTech Aviation, Inc. was an American aircraft manufacturer based in Scappoose, Oregon. The company specialized in the design and manufacture of kits for aerobatic aircraft. The company went out of business after 1998.

The company's two designs, the single-seat Giles G-200 and the two-seat G-202 were built from composites. The company could also supply completed ready-to-fly aircraft for the Experimental - exhibition category.

== Aircraft ==
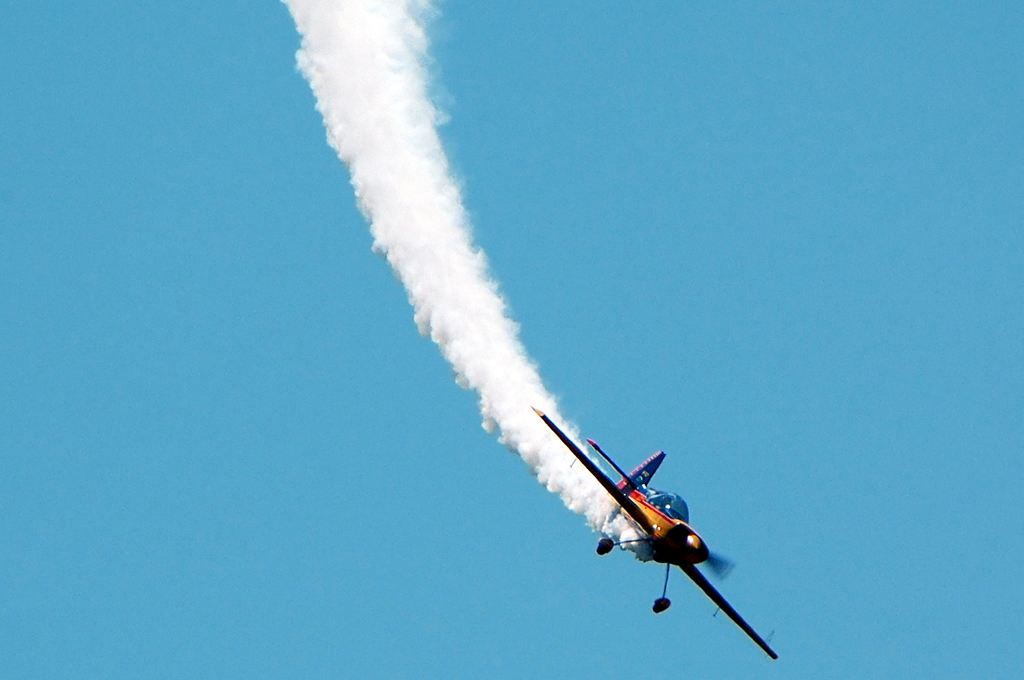
Giles G-202 performs at Oshkosh EAA AirVenture

Summary of aircraft built by AkroTech Aviation
Model name	First flight	Number built	Type
Giles G-200		At least 12	Single-seat composite aerobatic monoplane
Giles G-202		At least 26	Two-seats in tandem composite aerobatic monoplane
