= ConnectedDrive =

Collection of electronic features for BMWs

ConnectedDrive is a collection of electronic features for BMW vehicles.

ConnectedDrive was introduced in 2008 at the Geneva Motor Show as a web browser built into the car's infotainment system. Additional features have been added since, such as smartphone integration, synchronising with calendars, head-up display, lane departure warning system, active cruise control, night vision and traffic information.

== 2015 security flaw ==
In 2015, the German motoring association ADAC discovered security flaws in the ConnectedDrive system which potentially allowed attackers to remotely unlock the vehicle. To fix this flaw, BMW released a security update, which was automatically installed via the Internet. There are no reports of the flaw being used to gain unauthorised access to a vehicle.
