= Motorcycle tyre =

Tyres of a motorcycle

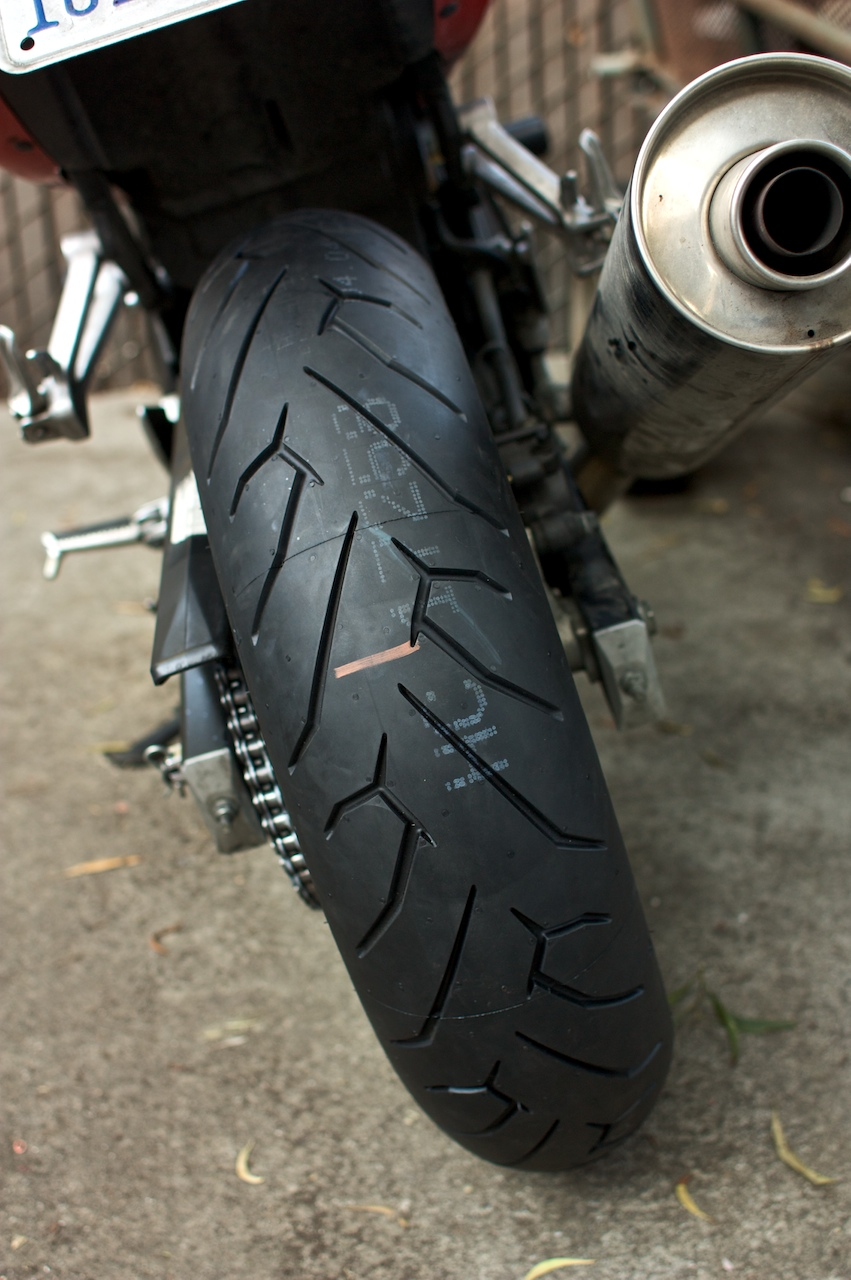
A rear motorcycle tyre for street use

A motorcycle tyre (spelt tire in American English) is the outer part of motorcycle wheel, attached to the rim, providing traction, resisting wear, absorbing surface irregularities, and allowing the motorcycle to turn via countersteering. The two tyres' contact patches are the motorcycle's connection to the ground, and so are fundamental to the motorcycle's suspension behaviour, and critically affect safety, braking, fuel economy, noise, and rider comfort.

== History ==
The history of motorcycle tyres is a clear progression of steady improvement in grip, allowing better acceleration, braking, and turning, along with improved comfort, safety, durability, and reliability. This progression has generally meant a steady increase in tyre width, so much so that Kevin Cameron noted the assumption among riders that "bigger must be better in every way", leading to, "the temptation to overwhelm motorcycles with the biggest tyres the owner can find." While many advances in tyre materials and construction have yielded unalloyed benefits, at a given level of technological sophistication, every design choice, such as tyre width, diameter, cross-section curvature, and the geometry of the motorcycle the tyres are intended for is a trade-off and a compromise.

Pneumatic tyres were invented by John Boyd Dunlop in 1888, and were in widespread use on bicycles and some early motorcycle prototypes by 1895. They were used on the first production motorcycle, the 1894–1897 Hildebrand & Wolfmüller, and have been on nearly all production and special motorcycles ever since. During this period tyre sizes were usually 22 to 28 inches (560 to 710 mm) diameter and 1 1/2 to 2 in (38 to 51 mm) wide.

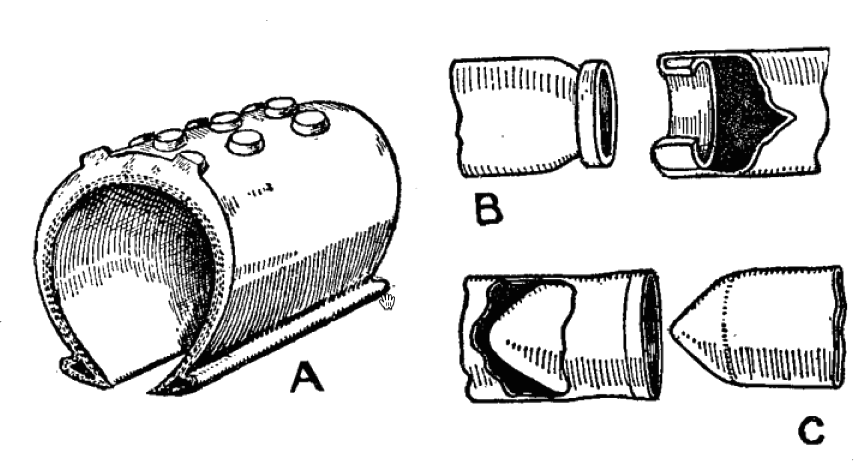
A: Typical outer casing of a tyre. B: Continuous, one-piece, or open-end inner tube assembly, where first a joint is made where one end slips into the other, with the collar member forced out tightly against the inner face of the retaining member. C: A butt-end tube, where the tapered, closed end fits into the open end, expanding to seal when inflated.

The early wheels were spoked, made of all metal, or wood and metal, and used inner tubes to hold air. Flats were a constant problem; largely the fault of poor roads and not necessarily tyres. For easier repair, butt-ended or open ended inner tubes were used on some models, and some brands made rear wheels easier to detach. Spoked wheels with tubes remained standard until the 1970s, when solid, usually alloy, wheels began to appear and eventually dominate street motorcycles, making lighter tubeless tyres practical.

As the early motorcycle industry progressed, larger tyre sizes accompanied larger engine displacements, so that by 1909–1914, 2 1/4 in (57 mm) section, 26 in (660 mm) diameter tyres were used on 250 to 350 cc (15 to 21 cu in) motorcycles, and 2 3/8 to 2 1/2 in (60 to 64 mm) section tyres appeared on motorcycles with displacements over 350 cc. Indian tyres reached 3.0 in × 28 in (76 mm × 711 mm), giving even greater rider comfort but with a taller seat height.

From 1915 to 1929, tyre quality continued to increase, and beaded edge tyres began to be replaced by wired-on beads, which used steel loops embedded in the tyre's edge to prevent it from expanding under pressure, so the bead no longer needed a grooved rim to hold it in place. Banded-edge tyre were obsolete and replaced entirely by the wired-on type by 1930. In the period 1956–1964, typical tyre grip increased by 40%, resulting in better cornering, shorter stopping distance and overall improved safety. This was the result of a greater range of tyre sizes appearing on the market, from small 3.5 in × 8 in (89 mm × 203 mm) scooter tyres through 4.5 in × 19 in (110 mm × 480 mm) heavyweight motorcycle tyres. A variety of rubber compounds and tread patterns further expanded the options, specialized for wet roads, smooth dry roads, racing, off-road use, and sidecars. Both natural and synthetic rubber were used, and tyres included fibres of cotton, nylon, and rayon for various structural benefits.

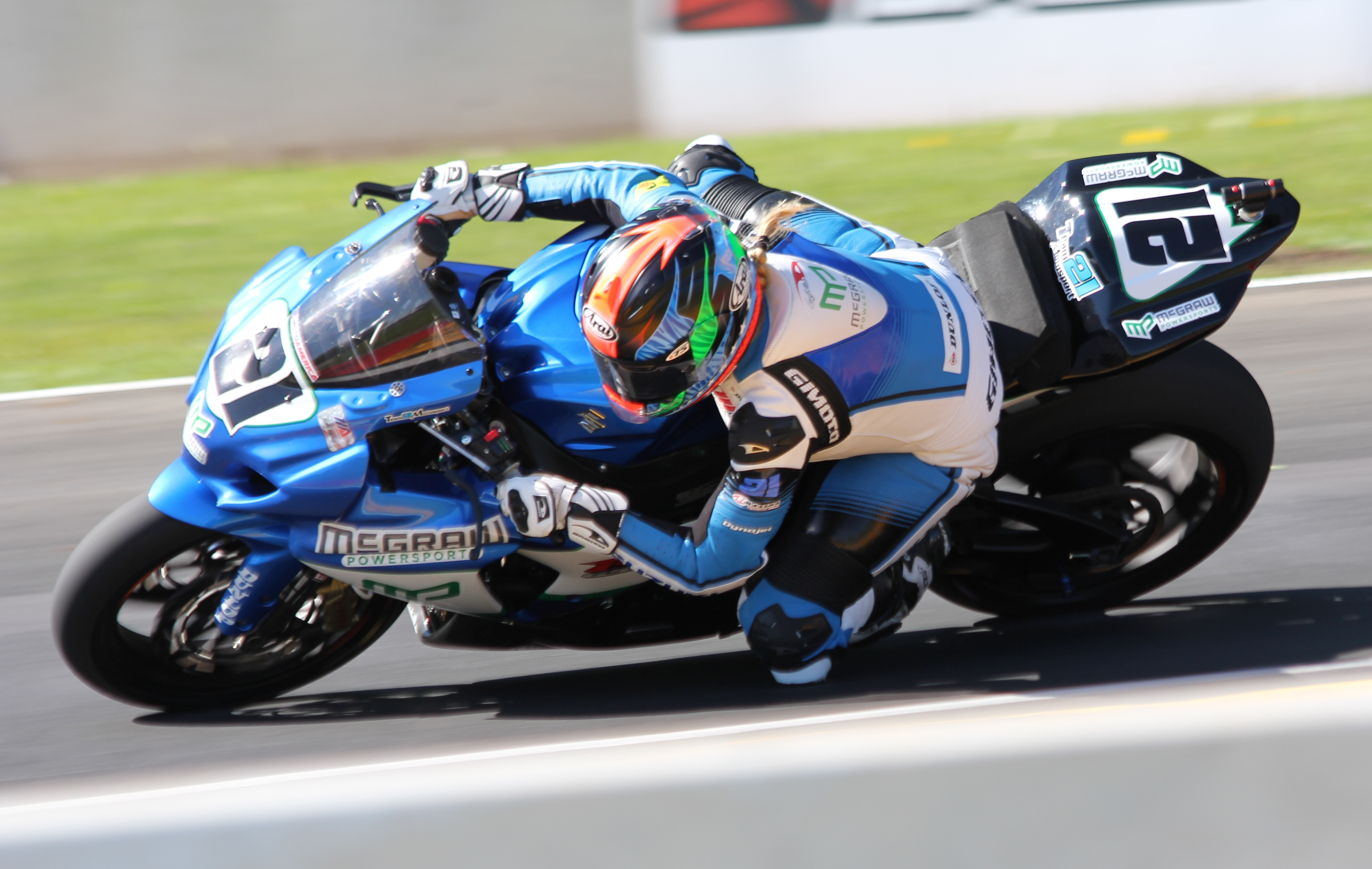
Elena Myers knee dragging while hanging off her Suzuki GSX-R1000 AMA Superbike at Road America.

During the 1970s, the increasing widths of tyres led to major changes in road racing cornering technique, leading to riders hanging off or knee dragging, in which the rider moves their body far off centre for the purpose of changing the combined centre of gravity of the rider plus bike, in order to turn at a given radius and speed at less of a lean angle. Racer John Surtees had been hanging off his MV Agusta as far back as the 1950s, in spite of resistance to the practice at that time from other riders, saying, "The idea is to keep the machine as upright as possible for maximum traction." Tyres of the 1960s and early 1970s had a rounder profile, but as they grew in width from the mid-1970s, the cross section became more oval, and the greater width of the tyre meant the contact patch was further off centre, increasing either steering effort or turn radius, at a given lean angle and speed, than it would have been with a rounder profile. To compensate, riders leaned out, moving their body's centre of gravity away from the motorcycle, eventually leaning out so far that their knee would skid along the pavement. Ablative knee pucks or knee sliders were then added to the riders' racing leathers to allow their knees to scrape smoothly along the tarmac through turns.

The first radial tyres for cars appeared in 1943, but motorcyclists waited forty more years for this technology to come to motorcycles. These were the 1983 Pirelli MP7 radials, introduced on the European version of the 1984 Honda VF1000R, a limited edition exotic motorcycle that showcased a number of new technologies including carbon fibre reinforced bodywork and air-adjustable anti-dive front forks. The new radial tyres had to provide race-replica handling for the very heavy 238 kg (524 lb) dry weight chassis, up to a top speed of 240 km/h (150 mph), making it the fastest production motorcycle of its day. The MP7 radials came to the US market in 1985. Radial construction uses textile or steel belts arranged at 90 degrees to the direction of travel, along with a layer of belts running around the tyre's circumference, with motorcycle radials deviating from the true radial design by adding belts running at angles to the radial belts, in the manner of bias-ply tyres, allowing the grip, durability, feel, and other characteristics to be adjusted to suit the tyre's design. The benefit of radial tyres is that the tyres run cooler yet maintain great flexibility, allowing engineers to coax significant increases in both grip and tread life, without compromise, under a broader range of conditions than bias-ply tyres.

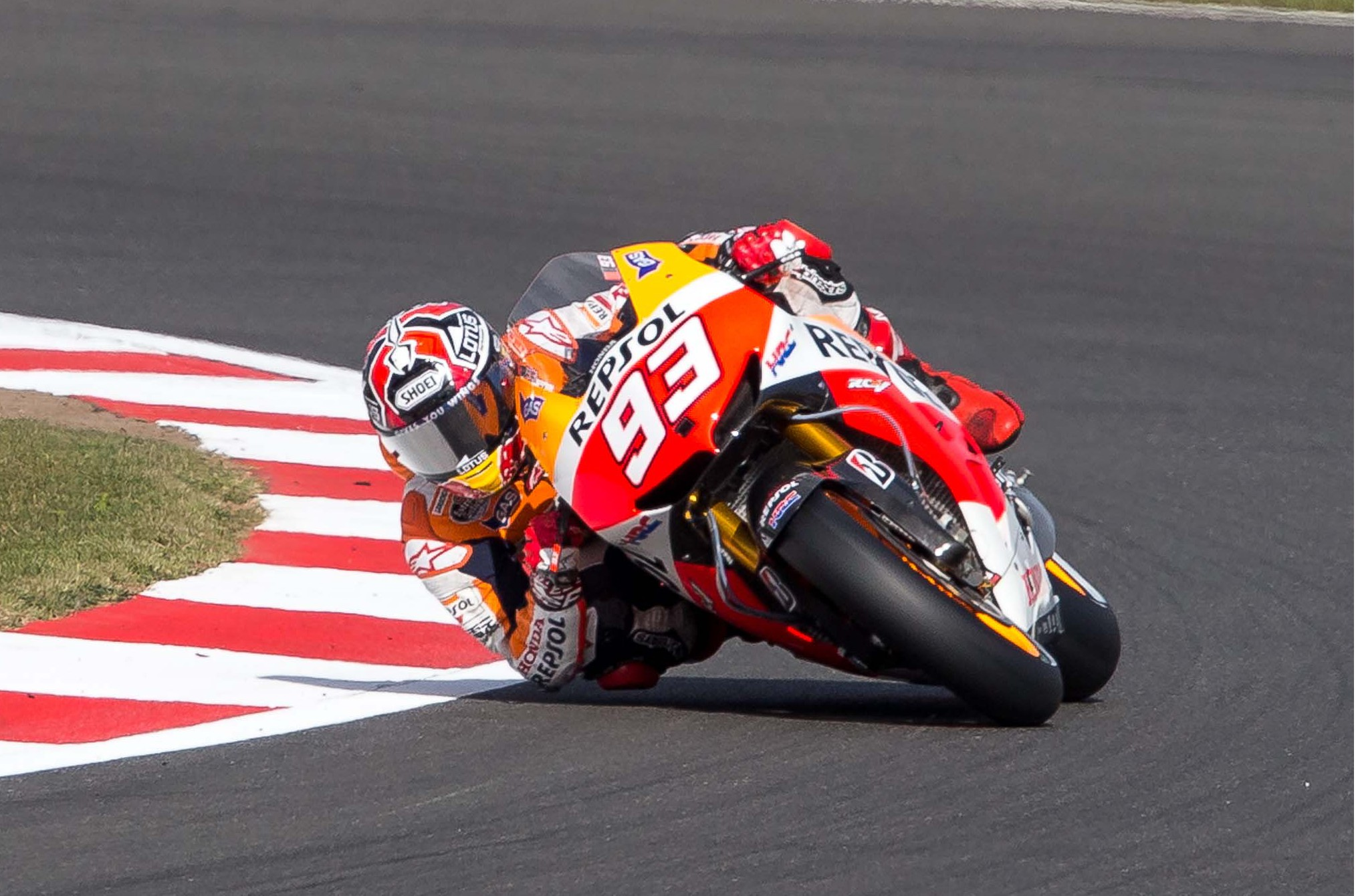
Marc Márquez, elbow down at the 2013 British Grand Prix

Changing tyre technology continued to influence riding style in 2013 in MotoGP, when rider Marc Márquez adjusted the knee-down cornering style begun by Mike Hailwood to a more extreme knee-and-elbow down turning, with much of his upper body off center. Márquez was working to use to best advantage the characteristics of the spec Bridgestone tyres all teams had been assigned since 2011, moving off center to keep the bike as upright as possible in the corner apex, and off the relatively flexible edge of tread area. To keep pace, other riders had to learn this physically demanding maneuver, requiring practice to change body position smoothly without upsetting the bike, a properly set up suspension keyed for this style of riding, and targeted muscle development to hold body position.

== Types ==
Motorcycle tyres are available for many different applications, including: Sport, Sport Touring, Touring, Cruiser, Scooter, On/Off Road, Dual-Sport, Enduro, Motocross and Racing. There are tyres designed for dirtbikes, touring, sport and cruiser bikes. | Sport/performance tyres provide excellent grip but may last 1,000 miles (1,609 km) or less. Cruiser and "sport touring" tyres try to find the best compromise between grip and durability.

There is also a type of tyre developed specifically for racing. These tyres offer the highest of levels of grip for cornering. Because of the high temperatures at which these tyres typically operate, use on the street is unsafe as the tyres will typically not reach optimum temperature before a rider arrives at the destination, thus providing almost no grip en route. In racing situations, racing tyres would normally be brought up to temperature in advance by the use of tyre warmers.

Sport Touring tyres are generally not used for high cornering loads, but for long straights, good for riding across the country.

Sport Street tyres are for aggressive street riders that spend most of their time carving corners on public roadways. These tyres do not have a long life, but in turn have better traction in high speed cornering. Street and sport street tyres have good traction even when cold, but when warmed too much, can actually lose traction as their internal temperature increases.

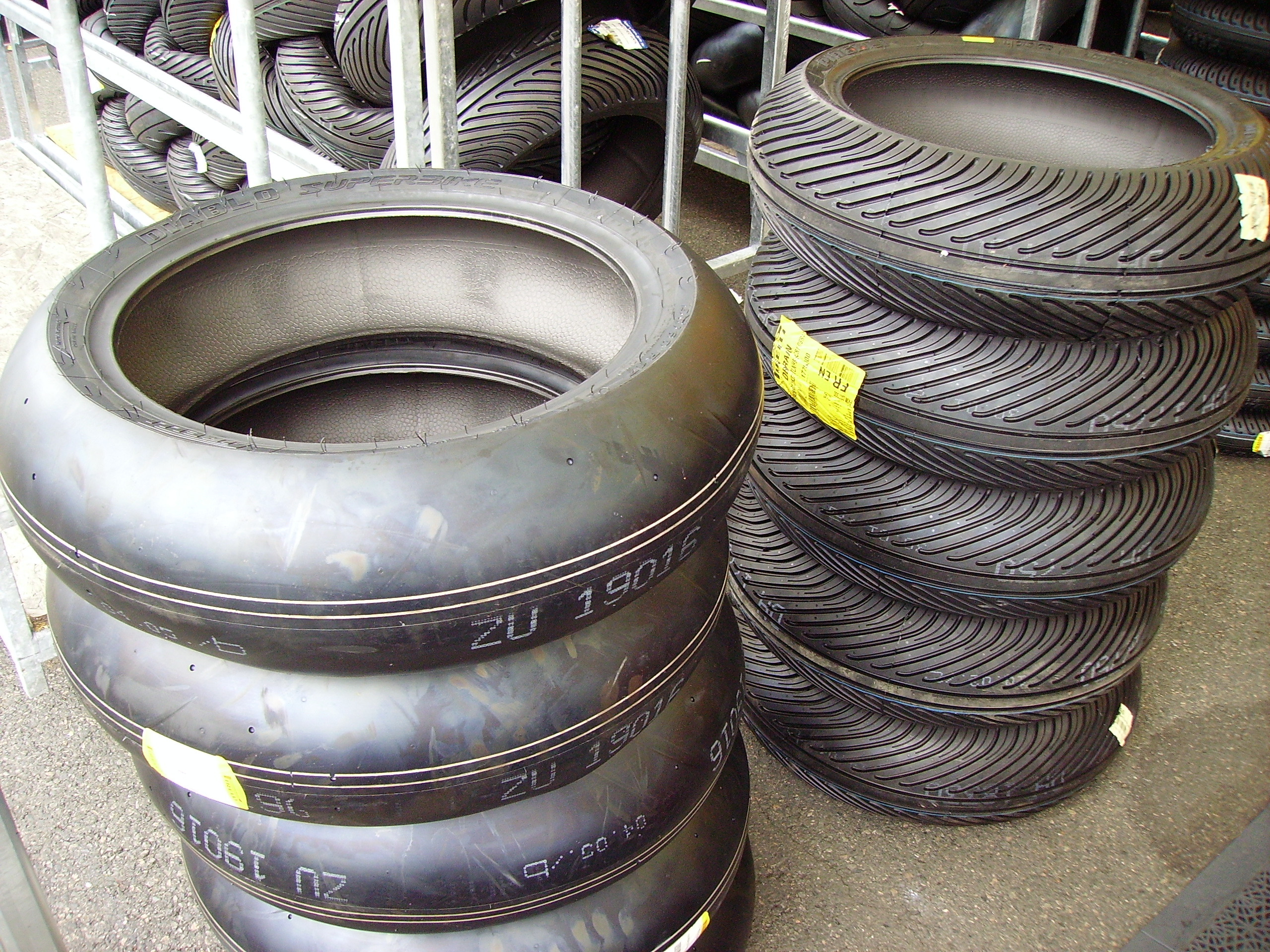
Pirelli Diablo Superbike slick tyres (left) and rain tyres (right)

Track or Slick tyres are for track days or races. They may have more of a triangular profile, which in turn gives a larger contact patch while leaned over. These tyres are not recommended for the street by manufacturers, and are known to have a shorter life on the street. Due to the triangulation of the tyre, there will be less contact patch in the centre, causing the tyre to develop a flat spot quicker when used to ride on straightaways for long periods of time and have no tread so they lose almost all grip in the wet. Racing slicks are always made of a softer rubber compound and do not provide as much traction as street tyres until warmed to a higher internal temperature than street tyres normally operate at. Most street riding will not put a sufficient amount of friction on the tyre to maintain the slick's optimal tyre temperature, especially in colder climates and in spring and fall.

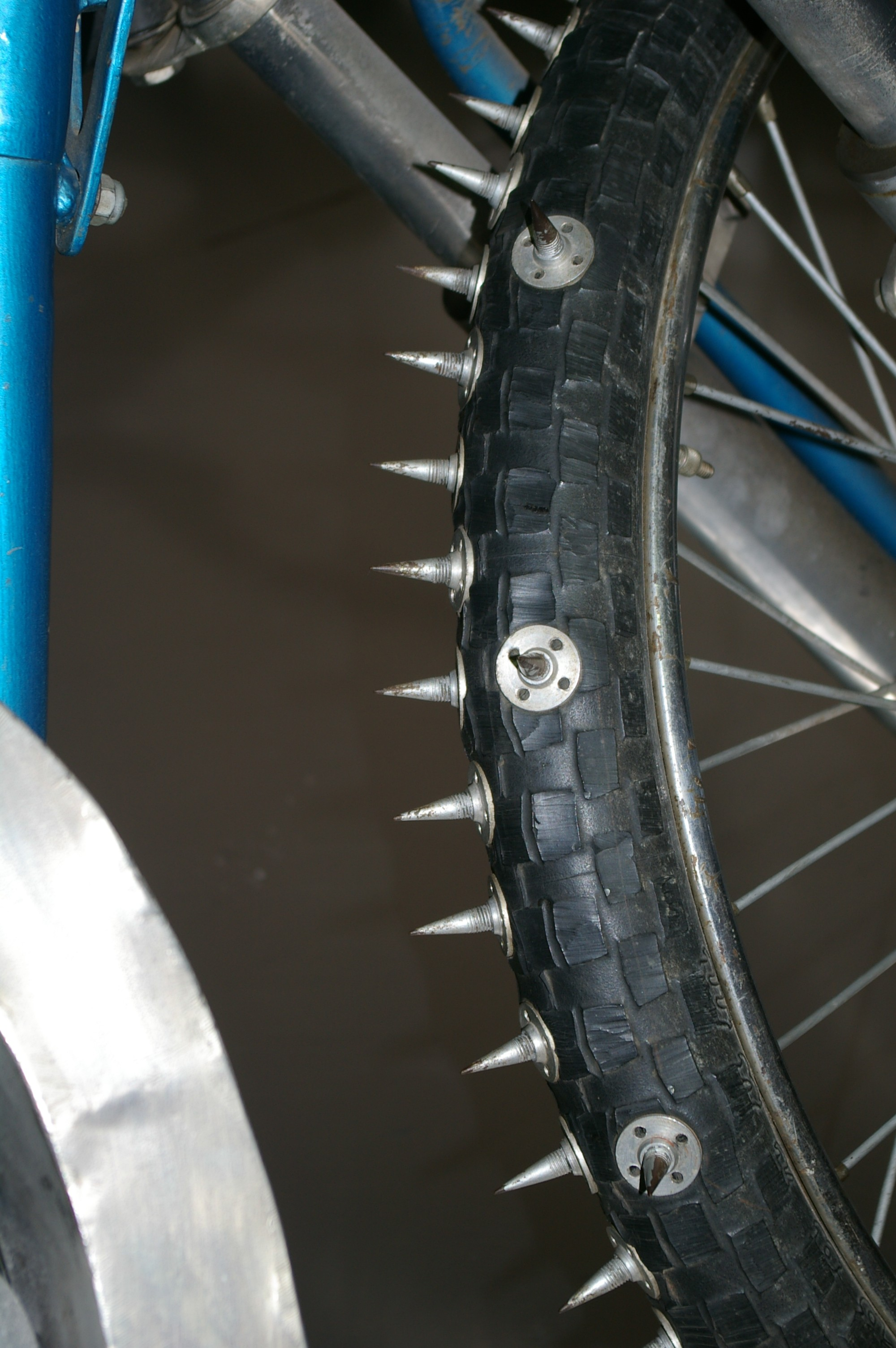
Studded front tyre with spikes used on Ice speedway

Cruiser tyres are relatively new. Until recently other tires would be used for cruisers, resulting in a tyre that wasn't quite right for cruising. Sport tyres for example, were often used to enhance the appearance of the bike, even if the bike doesn't have the power to use the tyres to their full extent. Cruiser tyres are often thinner and fatter than sports tyres, meant for a good grip and smooth ride. They are often decorated with custom rims, whitewalls, or tire stickers.

Dual-sport tyres have grooves that flow through from one side of the tyre to the other forming islands of tread, they are classified as 40/60 or 60/40 as in designed for time spent 40% on road, 60% offroad and vice versa, 40/60 has much smaller tread islands than 60/40 for increased traction offroad

Off road tyres have knobby, deep treads for maximum grip on loose dirt, mud, sand, or gravel; such tyres tend to be less stable on paved surfaces.

Touring tyres are usually made of harder rubber for greater durability. They may last longer, but they tend to provide less outright grip than sports tyres at optimal operating temperatures. The tradeoff is that touring tyres typically offer more grip at lower temperatures, meaning they can be more suitable for riding in cold or winter conditions whereas a sport tyre may never reach the optimal operating temperature.

== Properties ==
There are several properties of motorcycle tyres that influence the performance, handling, and stability of a motorcycle.

- Rolling resistance is the resistance that occurs when a tyre rolls on a flat surface. The rolling resistance coefficients of motorcycle tyres are about 0.02. It tends to increase with forward speed and decrease as inflation pressures increase.
- Cornering force is the lateral (i.e. parallel to the road surface) force produced by a vehicle tyre during cornering. Cornering force coefficients of motorcycle tyres tends to decrease with increased vertical load, increased inflation pressure, and increased temperature.
- Camber thrust is the force generated perpendicular to the direction of travel of a rolling tyre due to its camber angle and finite contact patch.
- Pneumatic trail is a trail-like effect generated by compliant tyres rolling on a hard surface and subject to side loads, as in a turn. It is the distance that the resultant cornering force of side-slip occurs behind the geometric centre of the contact patch.
- Relaxation length describes the delay between when a slip angle is introduced and when the cornering force reaches its steady-state value.

== Dual-compound tyres ==
Since about 2005 many manufacturers are producing rear tyres with the centre made of harder, long lasting rubber and the edges made from softer material, often high in silica. Most road bike manufacturers now specify these dual compound tyres as standard equipment due to their proven performance advantage. Single-compound tyres tend to wear down the centre strip well before the sides are worn out. The superior grip of the softer side material allows better grip at more extreme angles in dual compound construction.

== Speed and construction ==
As with four-wheeled vehicles, tyres for motorcycle have a tyre code, which describes a tyre's width, height/width aspect ratio, wheel diameter, load index and speed rating. The most common are:

- 3 digit number: The "nominal section width" of the tyre in millimetres; the widest point from both outer edges.
- /: Slash character for character separation.
- 2 or 3 digit number: The "aspect ratio" of the sidewall height to the total width of the tyre, as a percentage.
- An optional letter indicating construction of the fabric carcass of the tyre:
  - B: bias belt (where the sidewalls are the same material as the tread, leading to a rigid ride)
  - D: diagonal
  - R: radial
    - if omitted, then it is a cross ply tyre
- 2 digit number: Diameter in inches of the wheel that the tyre is designed to fit.
- 2 or 3 digit number: Load index; see table below
- 1 or 2 digit/letter combo: Speed rating; see table below

Load index
LI	kg	LI	kg	LI	kg	LI	kg	LI	kg
19	77,5	36	125,0	53	206	70	335,0	87	545,0
20	80,0	37	128,0	54	212,0	71	345,0	88	560,0
21	82,5	38	132,0	55	218,0	72	355,0	89	580,0
22	85,0	39	136,0	56	224,0	73	365,0	90	600,0
23	87,5	40	140,0	57	230,0	74	375,0	91	615,0
24	90,0	41	145,0	58	236,0	75	387,0	92	630,0
25	92,0	42	150,0	59	243,0	76	400,0	93	650,0
26	95,0	43	155,0	60	250,0	77	412,0	94	670,0
27	97,5	44	160,0	61	257,0	78	425,0	95	690,0
28	100,0	45	165,0	62	265,0	79	437,0	96	710,0
29	103,0	46	170,0	63	272,0	80	450,0	97	730,0
30	106,0	47	175,0	64	280,0	81	462,0	98	750,0
31	109,0	48	180,0	65	290,0	82	475,0	99	775,0
32	112,0	49	185,0	66	300,0	83	487,0	100	800,0
33	115,0	50	190,0	67	307,0	84	500,0	-	-
34	118,0	51	195,0	68	315,0	85	510	-	-
35	121,0	52	200,0	69	325	86	530,0	-	-

Speed rating
Rating	Speed (km/h)	Speed (mph)
Moped	50	30
J	100	62
K	110	69
L	120	75
M	130	81
P (or-)	150	95
Q	160	100
R	170	105
S	180	113
T	190	118
U	200	125
H	210	130
V	240	150
W	270	168
Z	over 240	over 150

== See also ==
- Bicycle tyre
- Inner tube
- Outline of motorcycles and motorcycling
- Outline of tires
- Tyre manufacturing
