= Bicycle tire =

Tire that fits on the wheel of a bicycle

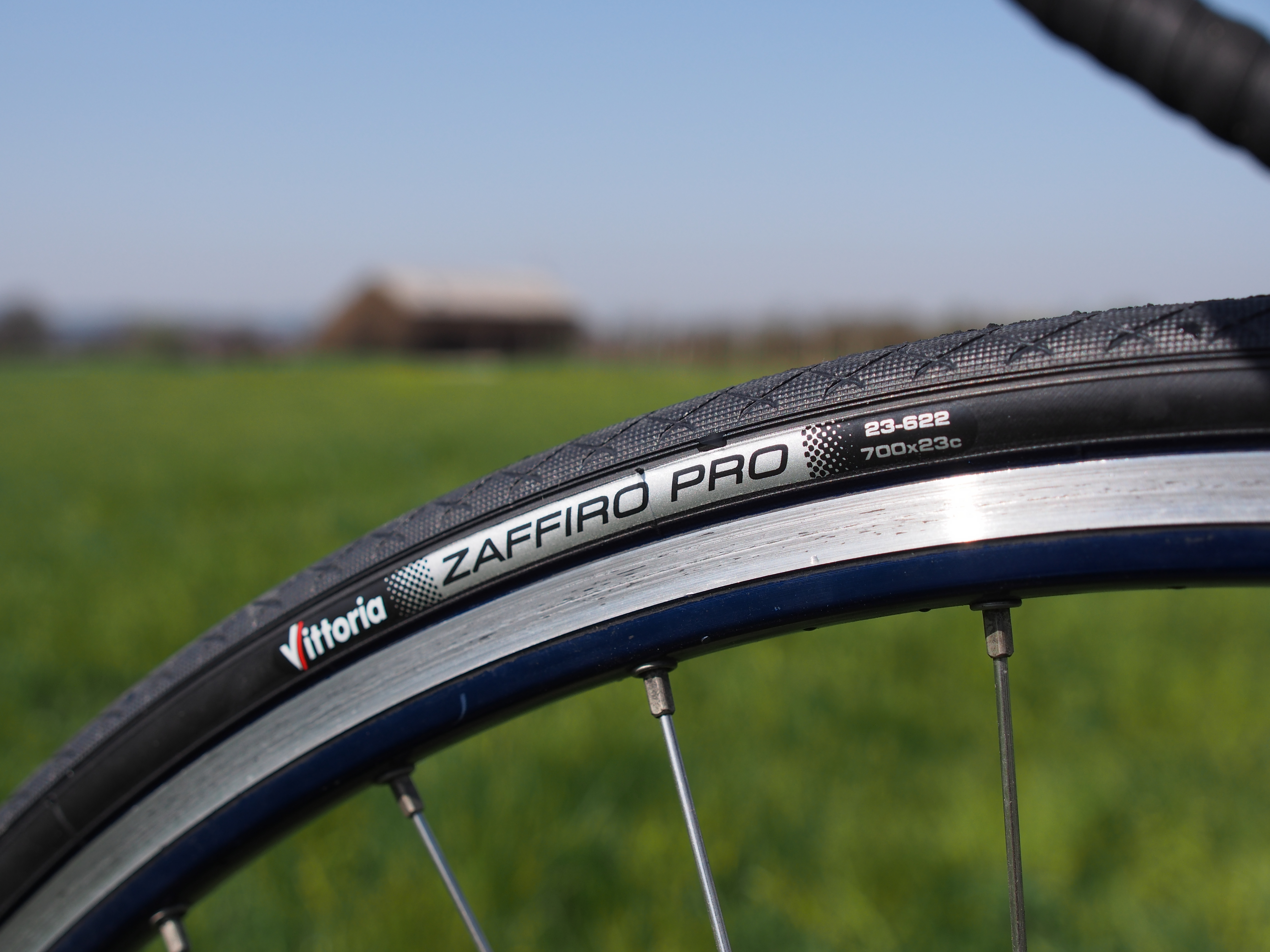
A clincher bicycle tire mounted on a wheel

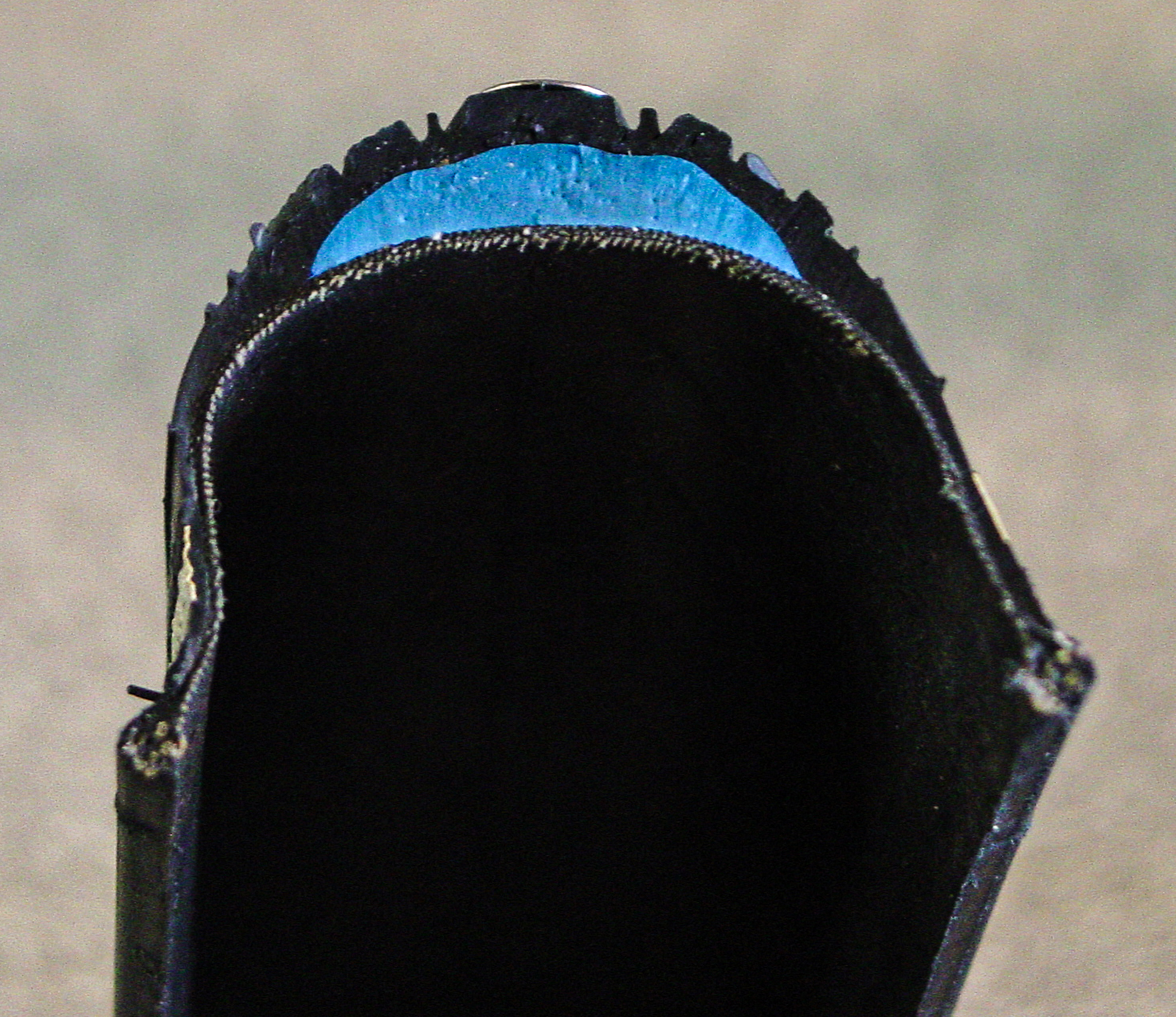
A cross section of a clincher tire with a puncture-preventing layer (in blue) between the casing and the tread

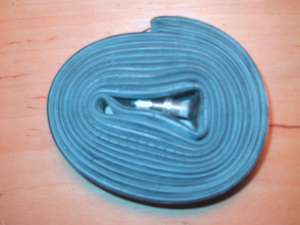
An inner tube rolled up for storage or to be carried as a spare

A bicycle tire (tyre in Commonwealth English) is a tire that fits on the wheel of a bicycle or similar vehicle. These tires may also be used on tricycles, wheelchairs, and handcycles, frequently for racing. Bicycle tires provide an important source of suspension, generate the lateral forces necessary for balancing and turning, and generate the longitudinal forces necessary for propulsion and braking. Although the use of a pneumatic tire greatly reduces rolling resistance compared to the use of a rigid wheel or solid tire, the tires are still typically the second largest source, after wind resistance (air drag), of power consumption on a level road. The modern detachable pneumatic bicycle tire contributed to the popularity and eventual dominance of the safety bicycle.

Bicycle tires are also used on unicycles, tricycles, quadracycles, tandem bicycles, hand cycles, bicycle trailers, trailer bikes, and wheelchairs. Bicycle tyre sizings often fall under ISO 5775.

== History ==
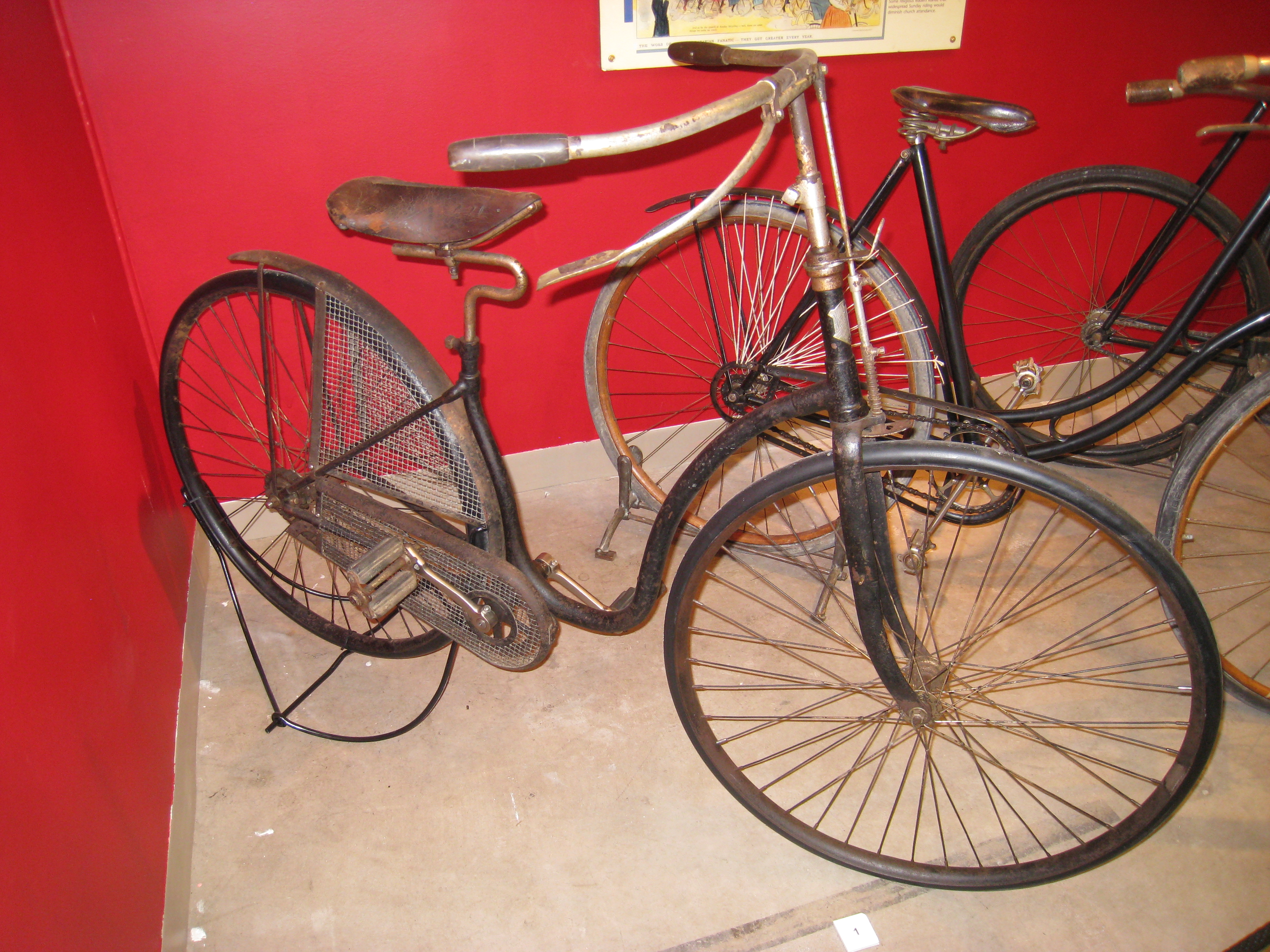
New Mail Ladies Safety bicycle, circa 1891, with solid rubber tires

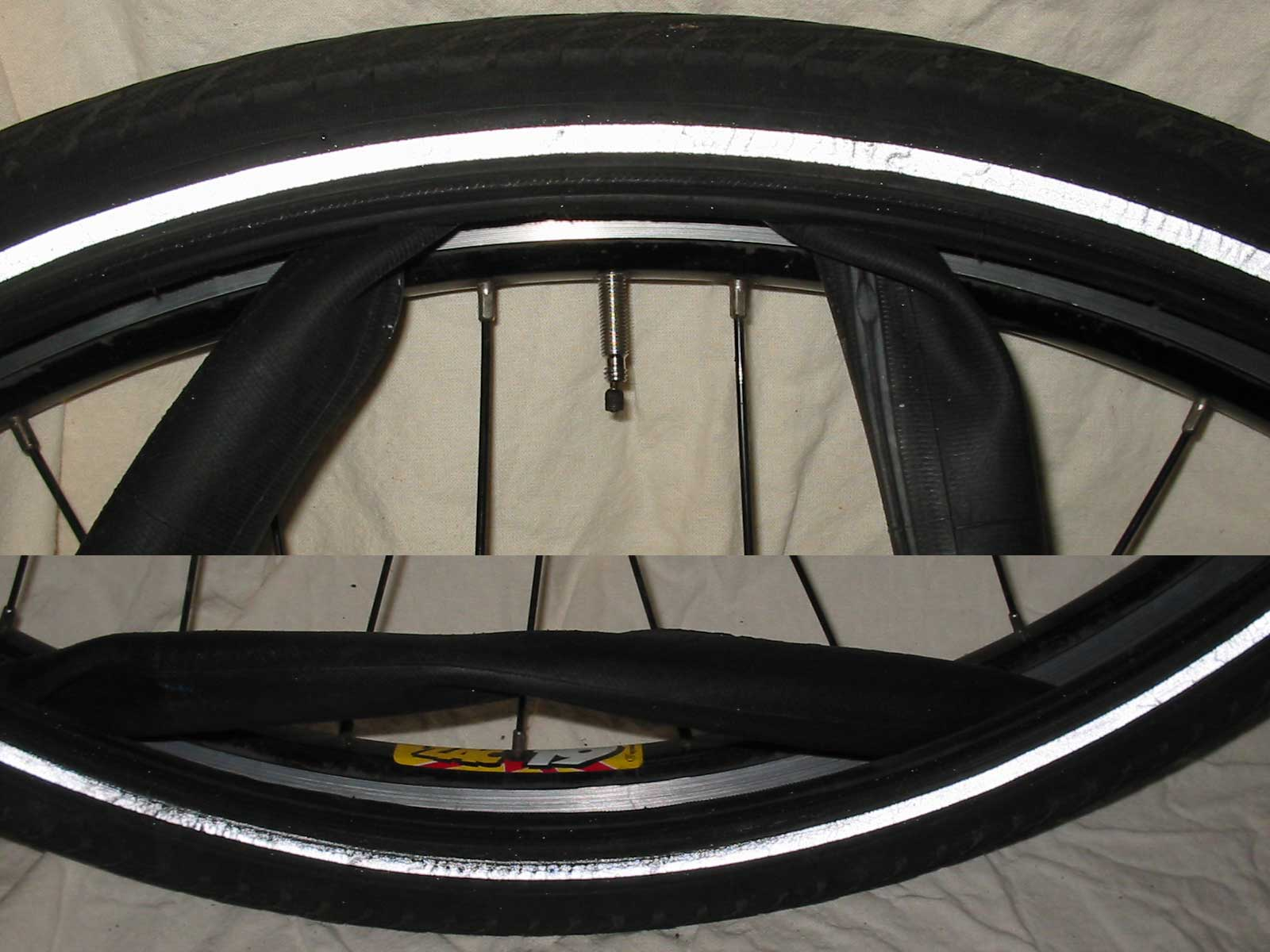
A tubed, clincher tire showing the inner tube protruding between the tire and the rim

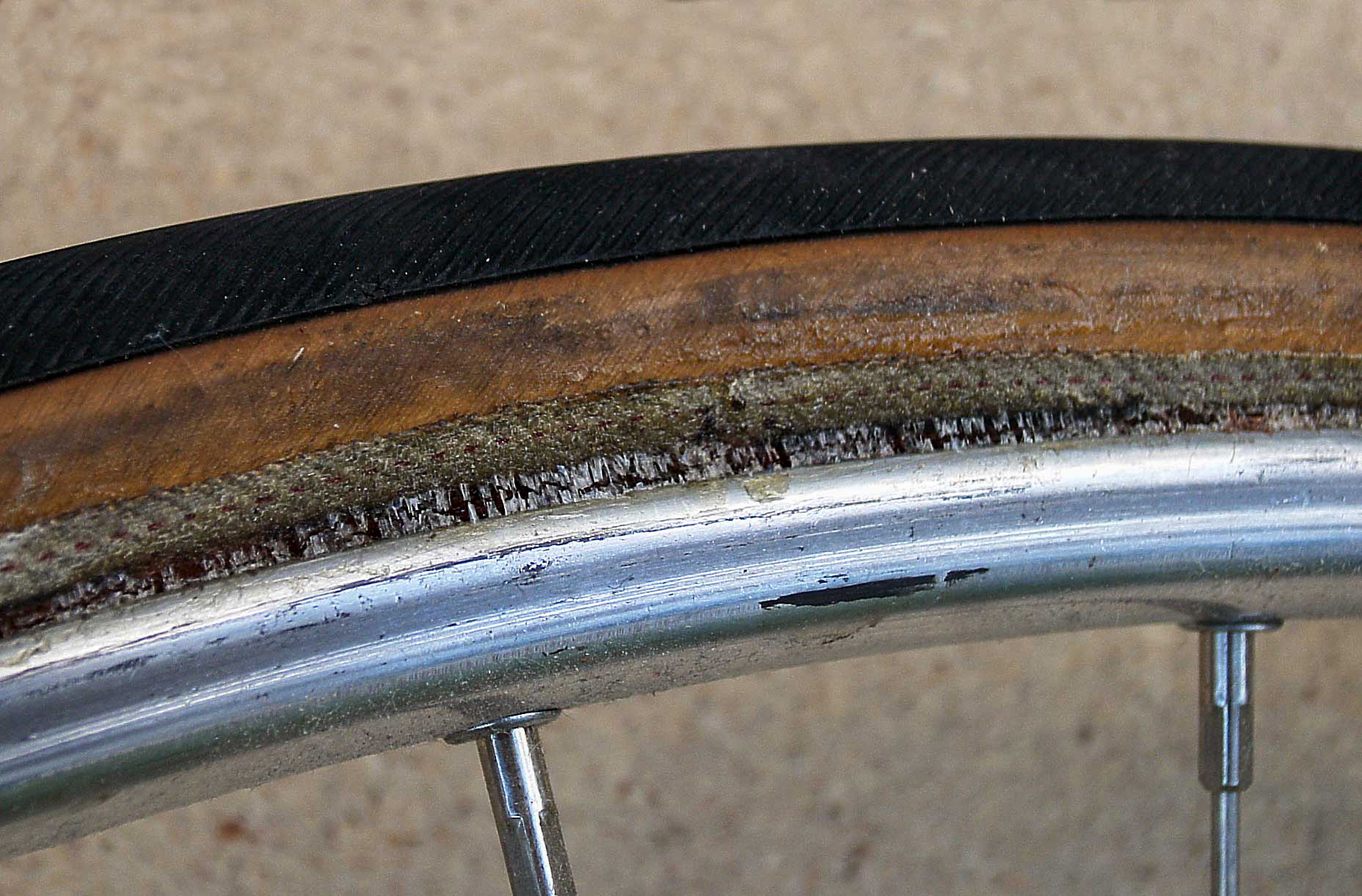
Tubular tire rolled from rim to show glue between them

Clincher cross section schematic with 1: rim, 2: rim strip, 3: rim braking surface, 4: bead core, 5: inner tube, 6: casing, 7: tread

The first bicycle "tires" were iron bands on the wooden wheels of velocipedes. These were followed by solid rubber tires on penny-farthings. The first patent for "rubberized wheels" was granted to Clément Ader in 1868. In an attempt to soften the ride, rubber tires with a hollow core were also tried.

The first practical pneumatic tire was made by John Boyd Dunlop in 1887 for his son's bicycle, in an effort to prevent the headaches his son had while riding on rough roads. (Dunlop's patent was later declared invalid because fellow Scot Robert William Thomson had patented them in 1846, before they could be manufactured economically). Dunlop is credited with "realizing rubber could withstand the wear and tear of being a tire while retaining its resilience". This led to the founding of Dunlop Pneumatic Tyre Co. Ltd in 1889. By 1890, it began adding a tough canvas layer to the rubber to reduce punctures. Racers quickly adopted the pneumatic tire for the increase in speed and ride quality it enabled.

Finally, the detachable tire was introduced in 1891 by Édouard Michelin. It was held on the rim with clamps, instead of glue, and could be removed to replace or patch the separate inner tube.

== Attaching to the rim ==
Three main techniques for attaching a bicycle tire to a bicycle rim have been developed: clincher, wired and tubular. Clinchers originally did not have wire in the beads and the shape of the bead interlocked with a flange on the rim, relying on air pressure to hold the tire bead in place. However, this type of tire is no longer in general use and the term clincher has transferred to the modern wired-on tire. For the remainder of this article, the modern use of the word clincher will be assumed.

In an attempt to provide the best attributes of both wired and tubular methods, tubular clinchers have also been offered.

=== Clincher ===
Most bicycle tires are clincher types for use with "clincher" rims. These tires have a steel wire or Kevlar fiber bead that interlocks with flanges inside of the rim. A separate airtight inner tube enclosed by the tire supports the tire carcass and maintains the bead lock. An advantage of this system is that the inner tube can be easily accessed for a patch repair or replacement of the tube.

The ISO 5775-2 standard defines designations for bicycle rims. It distinguishes between

1. Straight-side (SS) rims
2. Crochet-type (C) rims
3. Hooked-bead (HB) rims

Traditional wired-on rims were straight-sided. Various "hook" (also called "crochet") designs re-emerged in the 1970s to seat the tire bead on the wheel rim and hold the tire in place, resulting in the modern clincher design. This allows higher (80–150 psi or 6–10 bar) air pressures than was possible older wired-on tires. In these designs, it is the interlocking of the bead with the rim flanges, not the tight fit or resistance to stretching of the bead, that keeps the tire on the rim and retains the air pressure.

Some clincher tires can be used without tubes in a system which is referred to as tubeless. Typical tubeless tires have airtight sidewalls and beads which are designed to maximize the seal between the tyre and the wheel rim.

=== Tubular or sew-up ===
Some tires are torus-shaped and attached to tubular rims with adhesive. Tubular rims are designed with shallow circular cross-section beds in which the tires seat instead of being attached to rim flanges by tire beads as in clincher types.

== Providing suspension ==
Adequate tire casing stiffness is necessary to support the rider, while softness and flexibility in the casing is desirable for cushioning. Most bicycle tires are pneumatic, the stiffness of the tires is easily controlled by controlling the air pressure inside of the tire. Airless tires utilize a semi solid sponge type elastomer material which eliminates air loss through punctures and air seepage.

=== Pneumatic tires ===
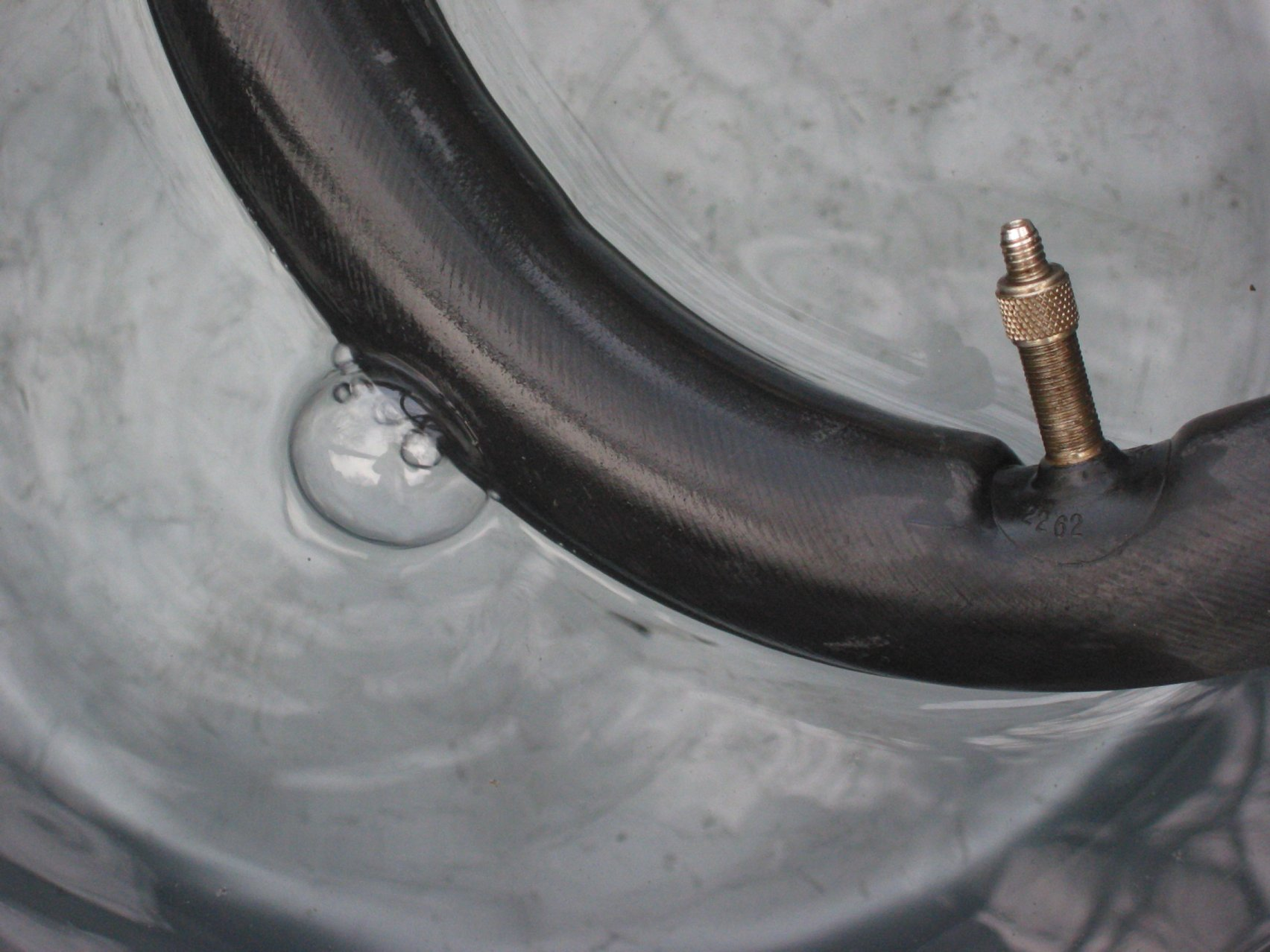
A bicycle inner tube with valve stem undergoing a leak test in water

In a pneumatic tire, pressurized air is held inside either with a separate, relatively impermeable inner tube, or by the tire and rim, in a tubeless system. Pneumatic tires are superior in providing effective cushioning while keeping rolling resistance very low. They were the first kind of air-pumped tires invented with the purpose of providing comfort to the rider, developed by John Boyd Dunlop in 1888.

==== Tubed ====
A tubed tire has a separate inner tube, made of butyl rubber, latex, or TPU (thermoplastic polyurethane) that provides a relatively airtight barrier inside the tire. A vast majority of the tire systems in use are clinchers, due to the relative simplicity of repairs and wide availability of replacement inner tubes.

Most of bicycle inner tubes are torus-shaped balloons while some are not. For example, inner tubes in bicycles of the Moscow bike-sharing service are simply rubber tubes long enough to be coiled and inserted into a tire.

==== Tubeless ====
Tubeless tires are primarily used on mountain bikes due to their ability to use low air pressure for better traction without getting pinch flats. Tubeless tires work similarly to clinchers in that the bead of the tire is specifically designed to interlock into a corresponding tubeless rim, but without an inner tube. Air is inflated directly into the tire, and once "locked" into the rim, the system is airtight. Liquid sealants are often injected into tubeless tires to improve sealing and to stop leaks caused by punctures. An advantage is that pinch flats are less common in a tubeless setup because they require a hole through the tire carcass, not just the inner tube. A disadvantage is that air can escape if the bead lock is compromised from too much lateral force on the tire or deformation of the rim/tire due to hard impact with an object.

Tubeless tires require tubeless-compatible rims, which do not allow air to escape where the spokes connect and have a different shape groove for the tire bead to seat.

===== Road tubeless =====
In 2006, Shimano and Hutchinson introduced a tubeless system for road bicycles. Tubeless tires have not yet gained popular acceptance in road racing due to lack of sponsorship, the tradition of using tubular tires and the fact that, even without the inner tube, the combined weight of tubeless rims and tires is more than top-of-the-line tubular tire wheelsets. Road tubeless is gaining popularity among riders for whom the benefits are worth the costs. Road tubeless tires tend to be a much tighter fit than traditional clincher tires, which makes mounting and removing the tire more difficult.

=== Airless tires ===
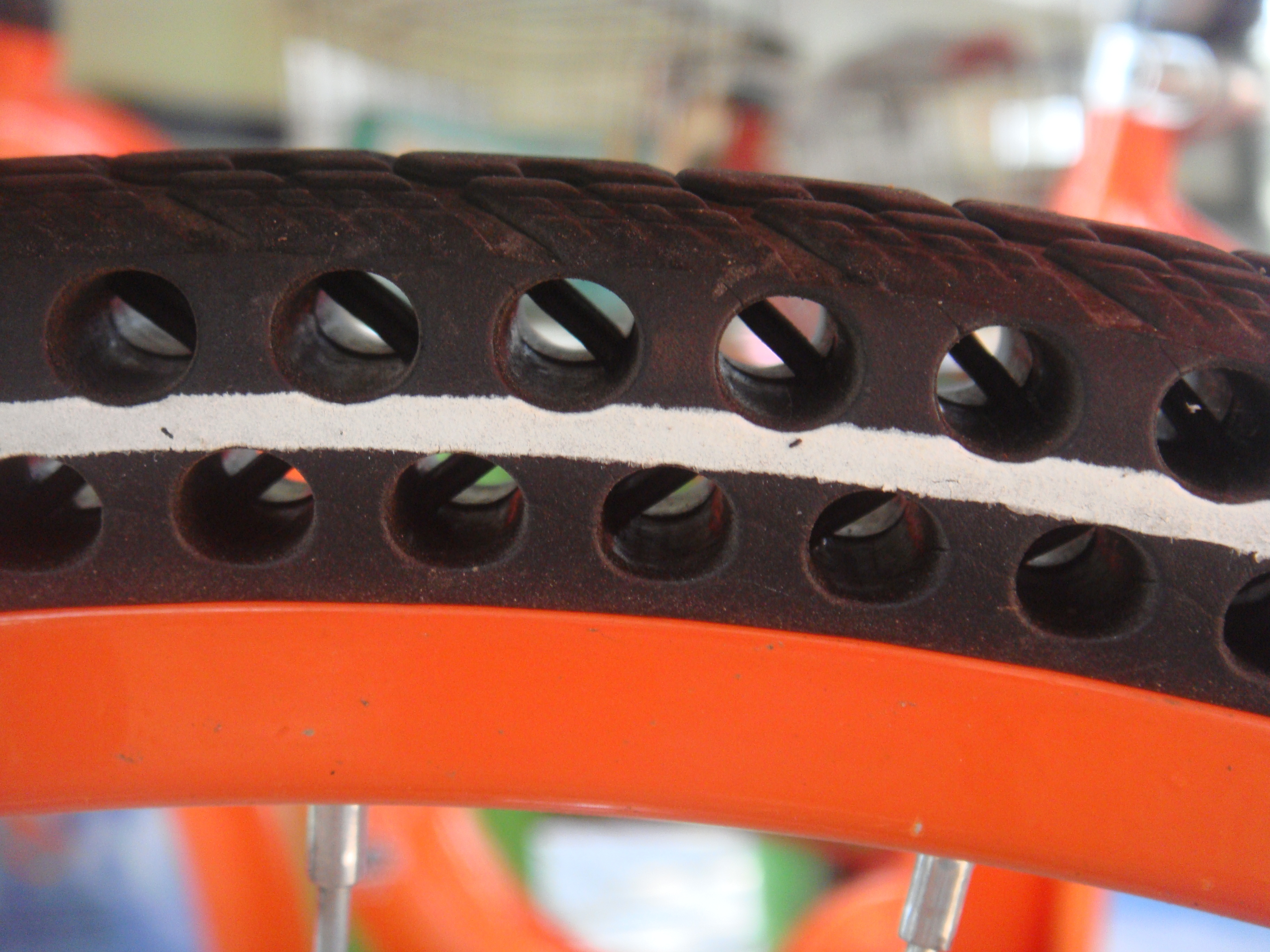
Mobike airless tire

Airless were used before pneumatic tires were developed, appearing on velocipedes by 1869. They continue to be developed in an effort to solve the problem of losing air pressure, either from a puncture or from permeability. Modern examples of airless tires for bicycles include BriTek's Energy Return Wheel, an airless bicycle tire from Bridgestone, the tire pictured to the right on a Mobike, and solid tires discussed below. Although modern airless tires are better than early ones, most give a rough ride and may damage the wheel or bicycle.

==== Solid ====
The most common form of airless tire is simply the solid tire. Besides solid rubber, solid tires made of polyurethane or microcellular foam are also offered for 100% flat prevention. Much of the desirable suspension quality of the pneumatic tire is lost, however, and ride quality suffers.

Many bicycle-sharing systems use these tires to reduce maintenance, and examples of solid tires include those available from Greentyre, Puncture Proof Tyres Ltd, KIK-Reifen, Tannus, Hutchinson, and Specialized.

== Construction ==
Bicycle tires consist of a rubber-impregnated cloth casing, also called the carcass, with additional rubber, called the tread, on the surface that contacts the road. In the case of clinchers, the casing wraps around two beads, one on each edge.

=== Casing ===
Bicycle tire casing is made of cloth, usually nylon, though cotton and silk have also been used. The casing provides the resistance against stretching necessary to contain the internal air pressure while remaining flexible enough to conform to the ground surface. The thread count of the cloth affects the weight and performance of the tire, and high thread counts improve ride quality and reduce rolling resistance at the expense of durability and puncture resistance.

==== Bias ply ====
The fibers of the cloth in most bicycle tires are not woven together, but kept in separate plies so that they can move more freely to reduce wear and rolling resistance. They are also usually oriented diagonally, forming bias plies.

==== Radial ply ====
Radial ply has been attempted, and examples include Panasonic in the 1980s and the Maxxis in the 2010s, but often found to provide undesirable handling characteristics.

=== Tread ===
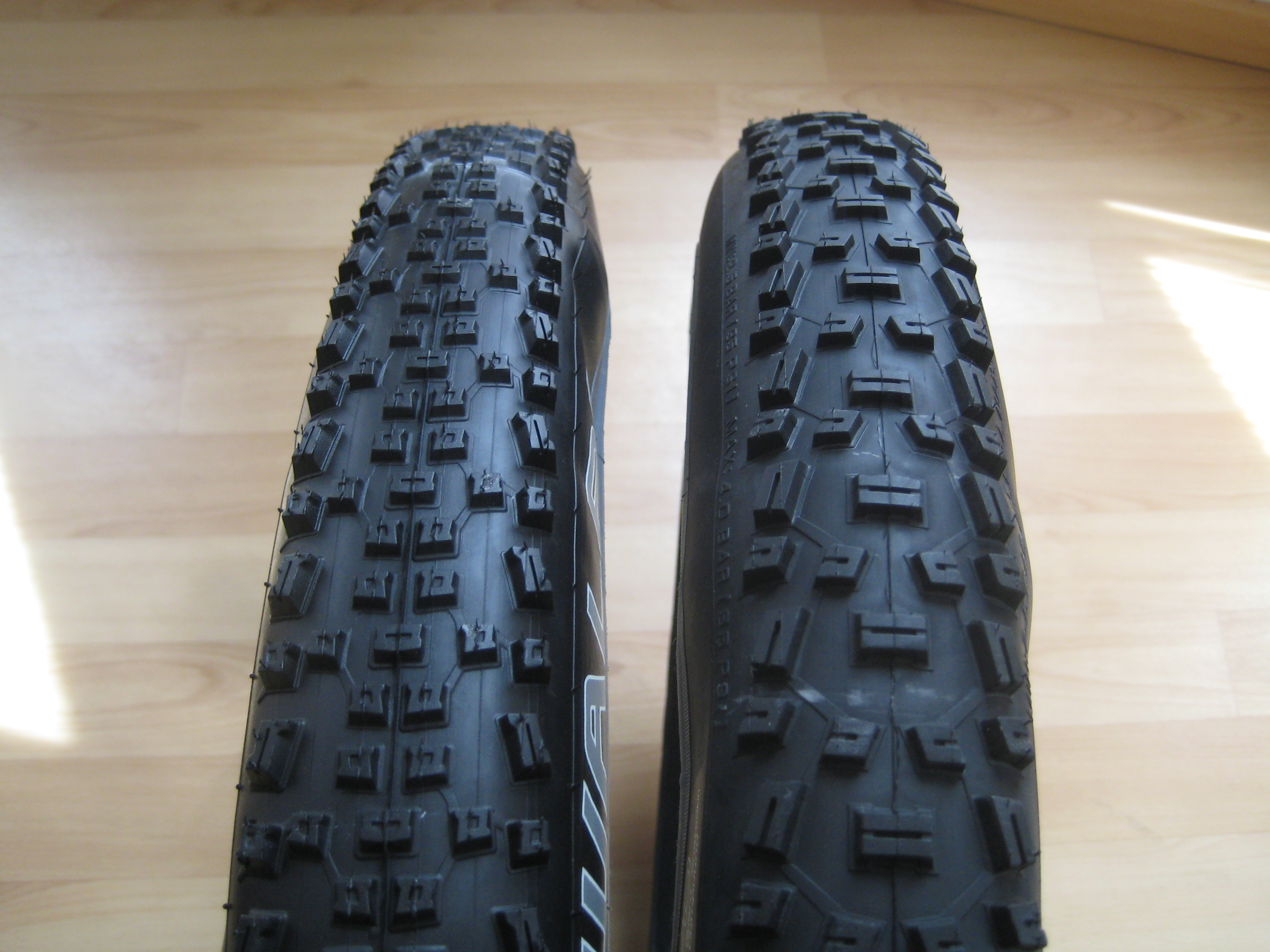
Different treads on knobby mountain bike tires

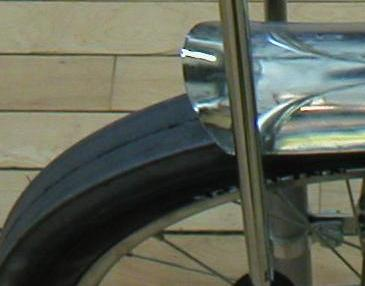
A slick tire with squared-off tread profile

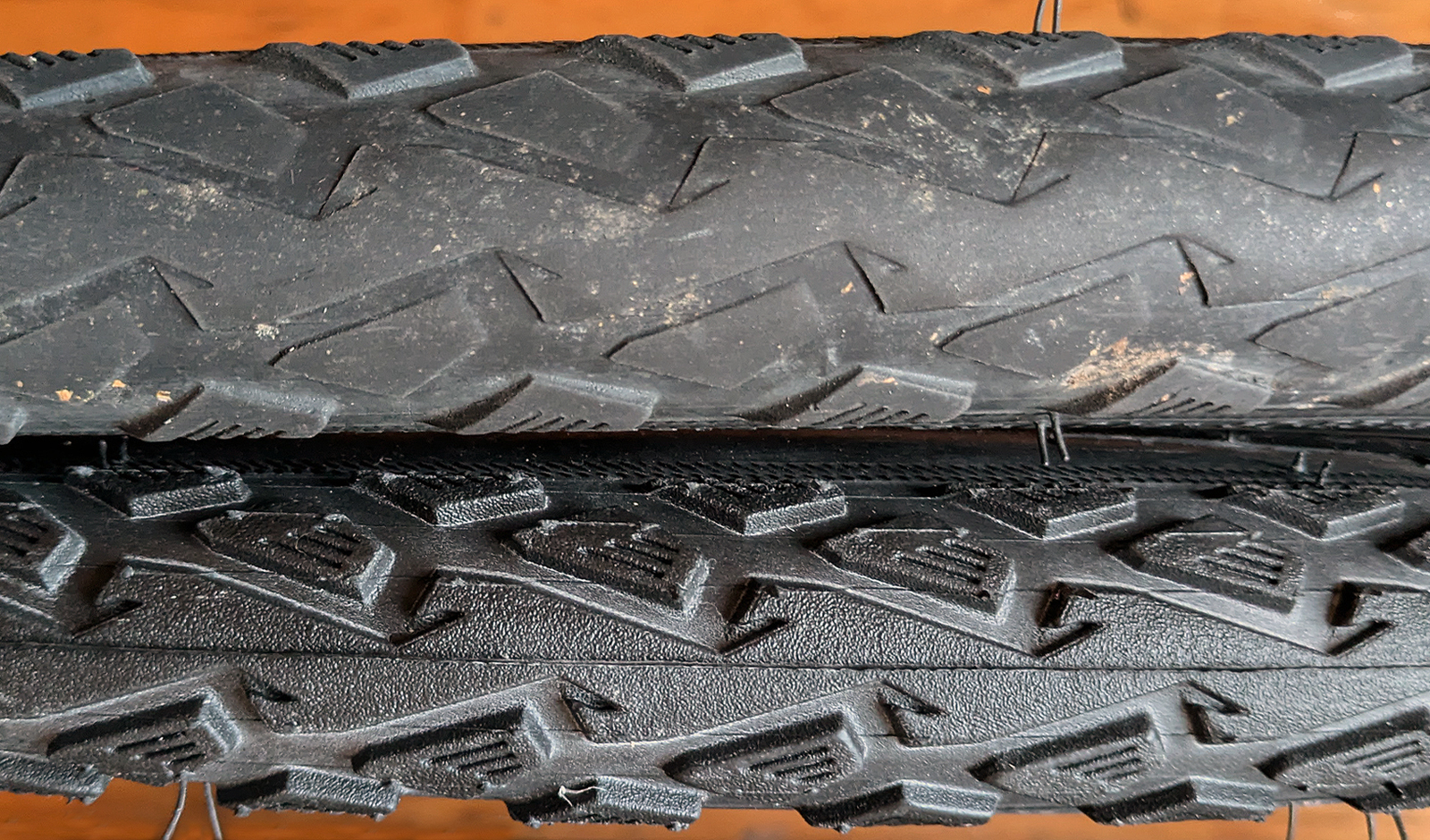
Two tires of the same make and tread pattern, the lower one completely unused, the upper one has rolled over 1500 kilometers on varying surfaces.

The tread is the part of the tire that contacts the ground to provide grip and protect the casing from wear.

Compound

The tread is made of natural and synthetic rubber that often includes fillers such as carbon black, which gives it its characteristic color, and silica. The type and amount of filler is selected based on characteristics such as wear, traction (wet and dry), rolling resistance, and cost. Oils and lubricants may be added as softeners. Sulphur and zinc oxide facilitate vulcanization. Some tires have a dual-compound tread that is tougher in the middle and grippier on the edges. Many modern tires are available with treads in a variety or combination of colors. Road racing tires with different tread compounds for the front and rear have been developed, thereby attempting to provide more traction in front and less rolling resistance in the rear.

Pattern

Treads fall somewhere along the spectrum from smooth or slick to knobby. Smooth treads are intended for on-road use, where a tread pattern offers little to no improvement in traction. However, many otherwise slick tires have a light tread pattern, due to the common misbelief that a slick tire will be slippery in wet conditions. Knobby treads are intended for off-road use, where the tread texture can help improve traction on soft surfaces. Many treads are omnidirectional—the tire can be installed in either orientation—but some are unidirectional and designed to be oriented in a specific direction. Some tires, especially for mountain bikes, have a tread which is intended either for the front wheel or the rear wheel. A special tread pattern, with small dimples, has been developed to reduce air drag.

Profile

The profile of the tread is usually circular, matching the shape of the casing inside it and allowing the tire to roll to the side as the bicycle leans for turning or balancing. More-squared profiles are sometimes used on mountain bike tires and novelty tires designed to look like automotive racing slicks, as on wheelie bikes.

=== Bead ===
The bead of clincher tires must be made of a material that will stretch very little to prevent the tire from expanding off of the rim under internal air pressure.

Wire

Steel wire beads are used on inexpensive tires. Though they cannot be folded, they can often be twisted into three smaller hoops.

Kevlar

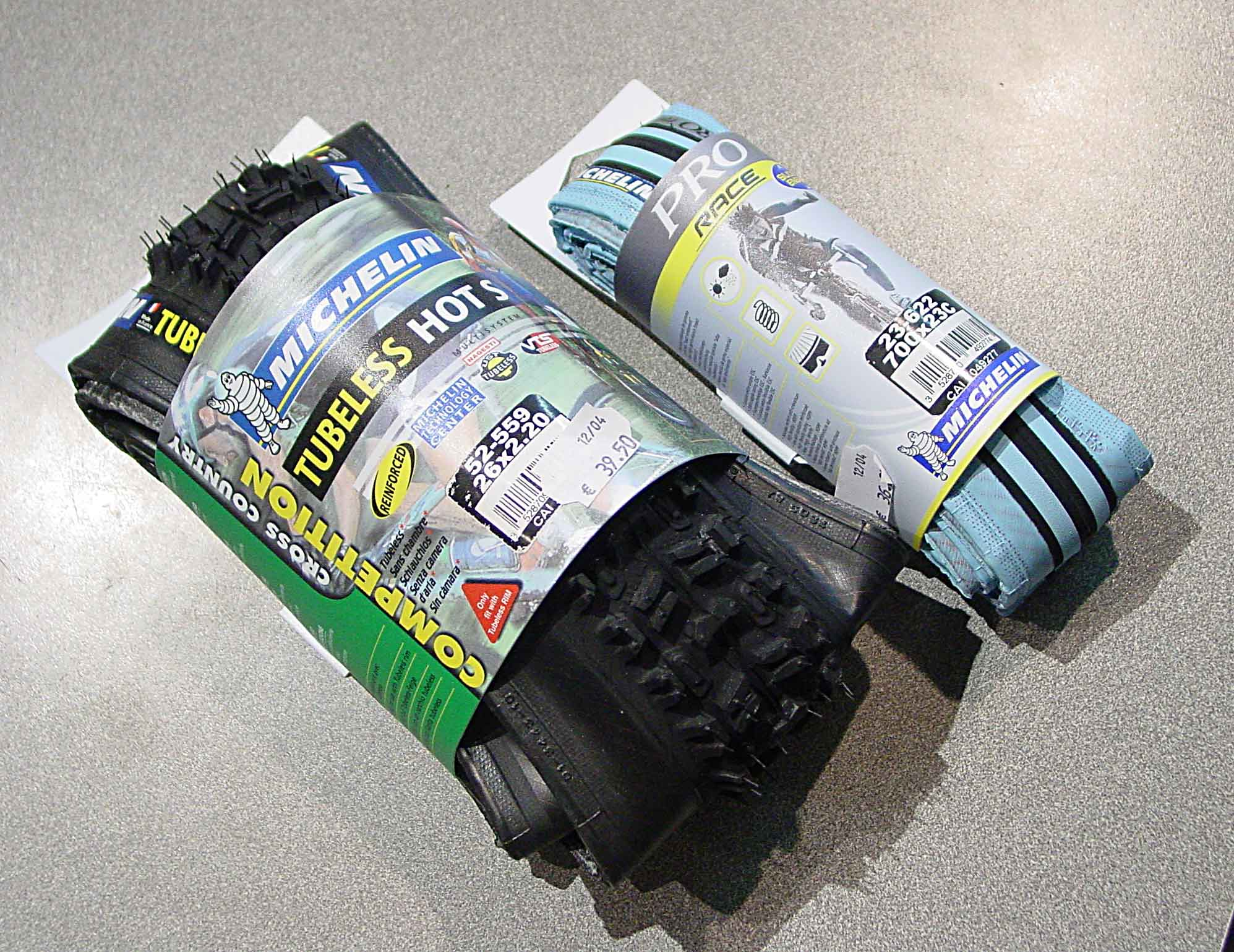
A foldable mountain and road bicycle tire

Kevlar beads are used on expensive tires, and these are also called "foldable". They should not be used on straight sidewall rims as they may blow off the rim.

=== Sidewall ===
The sidewall of the casing, the part not intended to contact the ground, may receive one of several treatments.

Gum wall

Tires with sidewalls made of natural rubber are called "gum wall". The tan colored, natural rubber lacks carbon black to decrease rolling resistance, as its added wear resistance isn't needed in the sidewall.

Skin wall

Tires with very little rubber, if any, covering the sidewall are called "skin wall". This reduces rolling resistance by reducing sidewall stiffness at the cost of reducing damage protection.

=== Variations ===
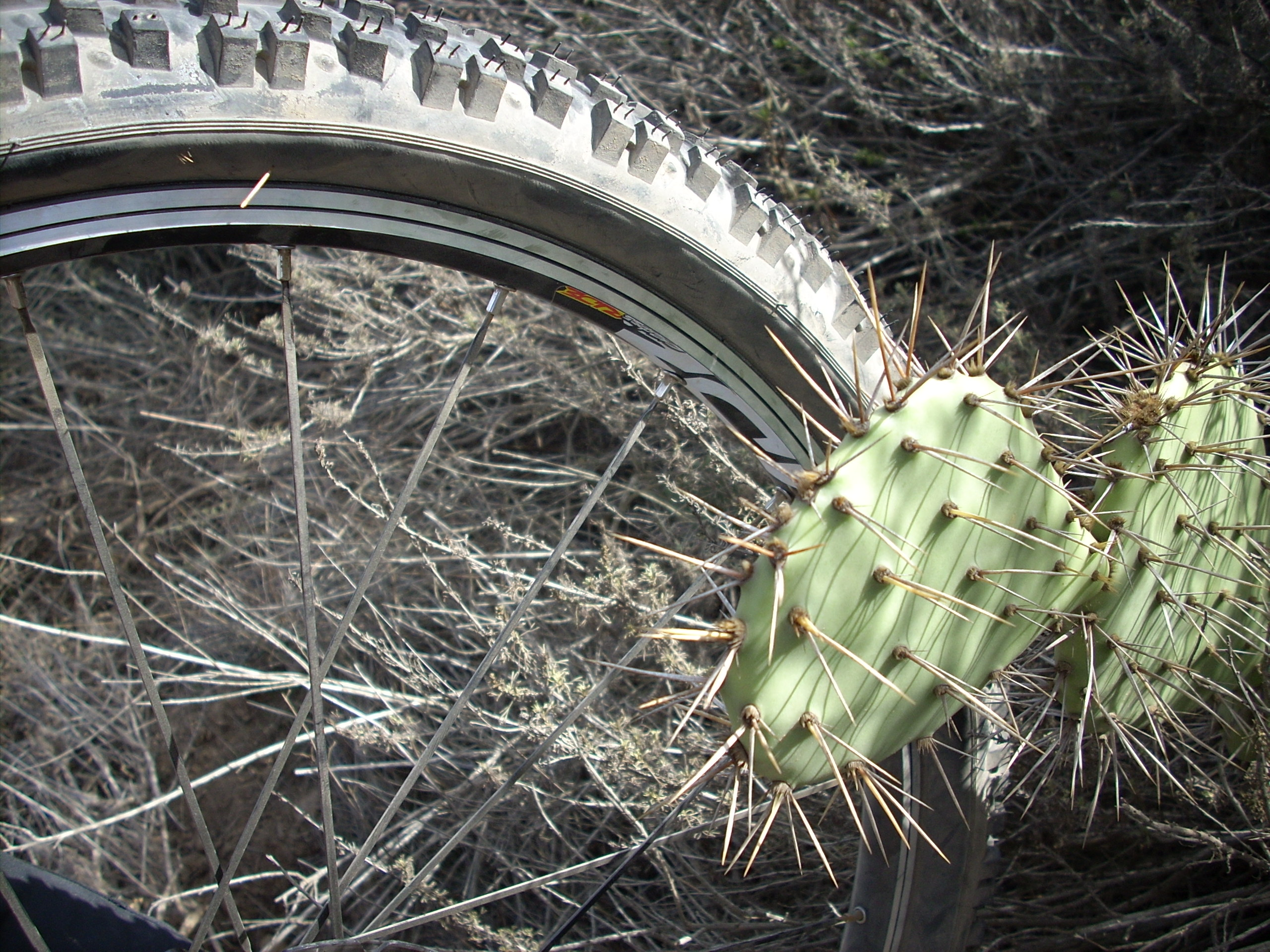
A punctured tire.

==== Puncture resistance ====
Some tires include an extra layer between the tread and the casing (as shown in the cross section pictured above) to help prevent punctures either by being tough or simply by being thick. These extra layers are usually associated with higher rolling resistance.

==== Studs ====
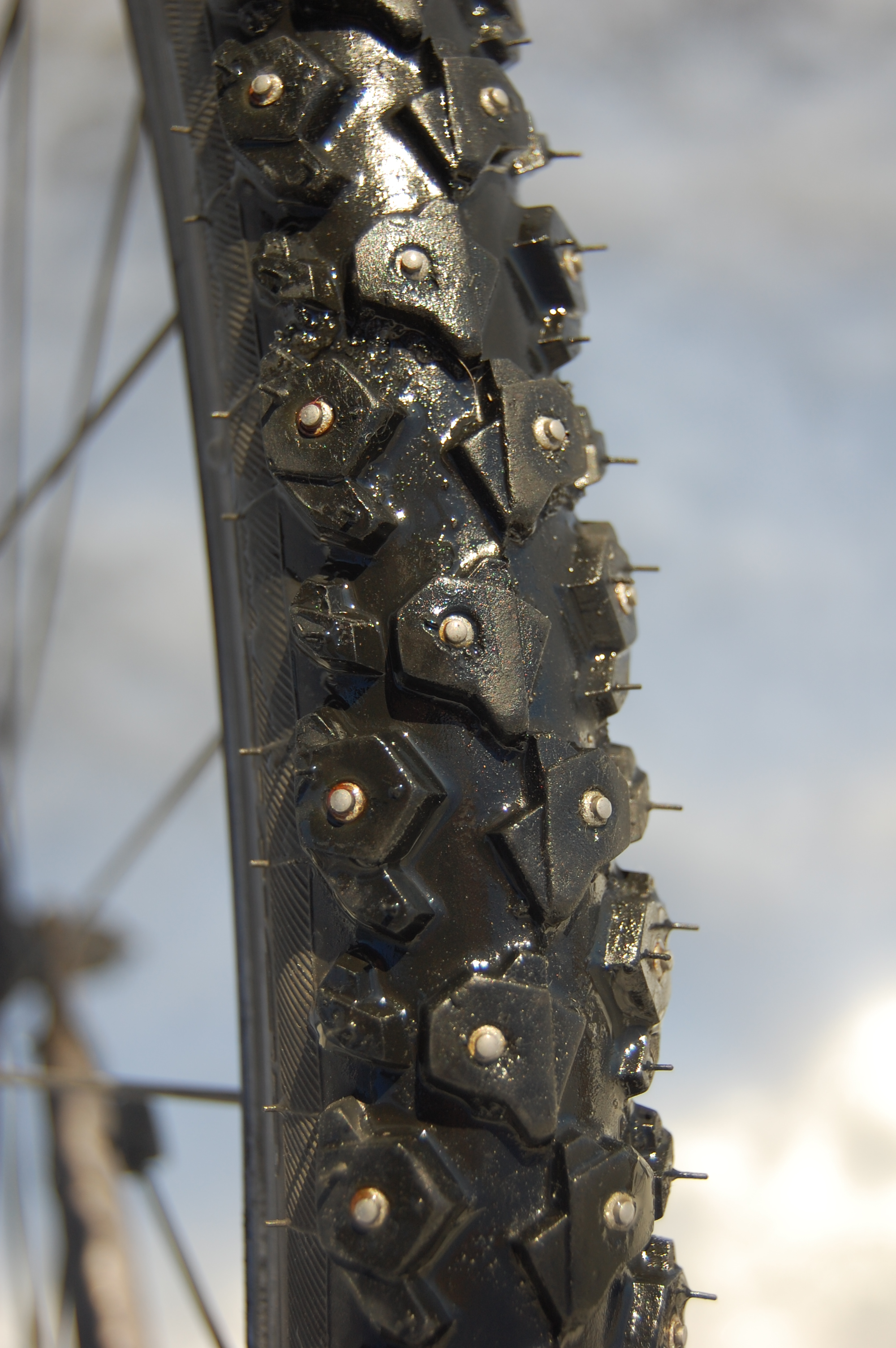
A studded, knobby tire

Metal studs may be embedded in the tread of knobby tires to improve traction on ice. Inexpensive studded tires use steel studs, while pricier tires use more durable carbide studs. A studded, knobby tread that zips onto a smoother, non-studded tire has been developed to ease the transition between the two types of tires.

==== Reflective ====
Some tires have a reflective strip on their sidewalls to improve visibility at night. Others have reflective material embedded in the tread.

==== Aerodynamics ====
In addition to the dimple tread pattern mentioned above, at least one tire has an extra "wing" to cover the gap between the tire sidewall and the wheel rim and reduce drag.

==== Indoor use ====
At least one modern bicycle tire has been designed specifically for indoor use on rollers or trainers. It minimizes excessive wear that traditional tires experience in this environment and is not suitable for use on pavement.

==== Different front and rear ====
Besides the different tread patterns available on some mountain bike tires mentioned above, front and rear tire sets are available for road bikes with different tread patterns, tread compounds, and sizes for the front and rear wheels. Other scenarios involve replacing a damaged tire, and leaving the other one unchanged.

==== Self inflating ====
Bicycle tires have been developed that pump themselves up as they roll forward.

==== Modular ====
Bicycle tires have been developed so that different treads can be zipped on and off. This allows having the additional traction of studded tires only when necessary and avoiding the additional rolling resistance otherwise.

== Parameters ==
=== Sizes ===
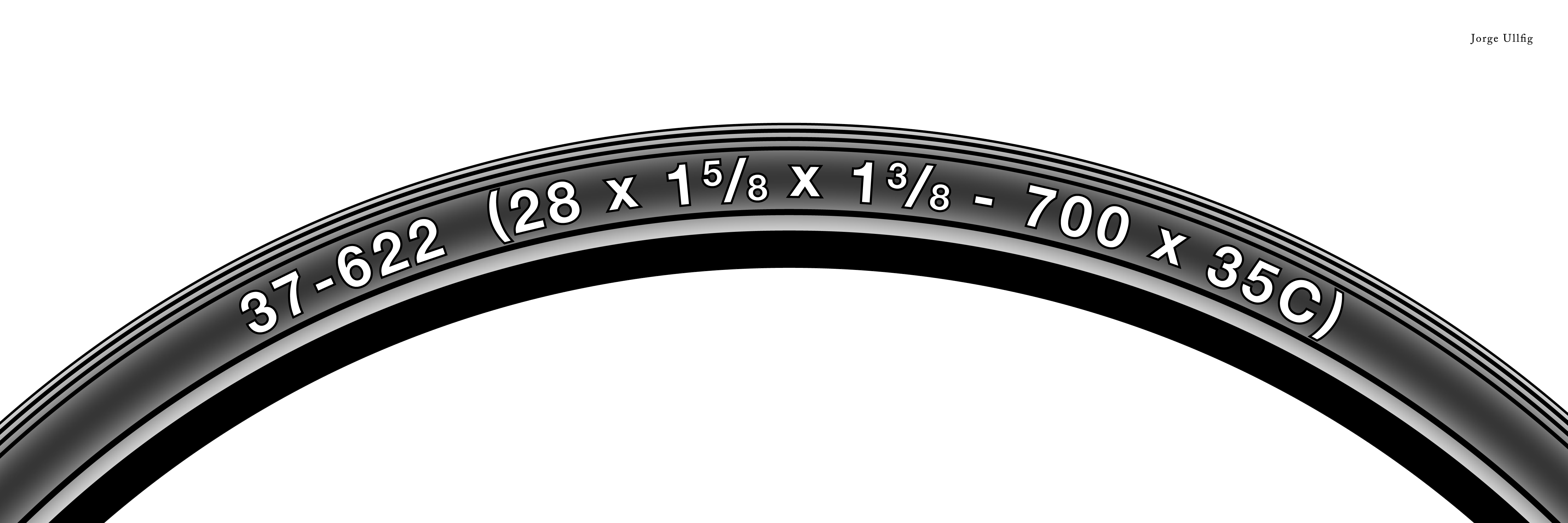
Tire-size designations on the side of a tire

The modern tire-size designations (e.g. "37-622", also known as ETRTO) are defined by international standard ISO 5775, along with corresponding rim size designations (e.g., "622×19C"). Older English (inch, e.g. "28 × 1 5/8 × 1 3/8") and French (metric, e.g. "700×35C") designations are also still used, but can be ambiguous.

The diameter of the tire must match the diameter of the rim, but the width of the tire only has to be in the range of widths appropriate for the width of the rim, while also not exceeding the clearances allowed by the frame, brakes, and any accessories such as fenders. Diameters vary from a large 910 mm, for touring unicycles, to a small 125 mm, for roller skiing. Widths vary from a narrow 18 mm to a wide 119 mm for the Surly Big Fat Larry.

==== Lightweight tires ====
Lightweight tires range in size from 3/4 to 1 1/8 inches (19 to 29 mm) wide.

==== Middleweight or Demi-balloon tires ====
Middleweight or Demi-balloon tires range in size from 1 1/8 to 1 3/4 inches (29 to 44 mm) wide.

==== Balloon tires ====
A balloon tire is a type of wide, large-volume, low-pressure tire that first appeared on cruiser bicycles in the US in the 1930s. They are typically 2 to 2.5 inches (51 to 64 mm) wide.

In the 1960s Raleigh made its small-wheeled RSW 16 with balloon tires so it would have a soft ride like the fully suspended Moulton Bicycle. Other manufacturers then used the same idea for their own small wheelers. Examples include the Stanningley (UK)-made Bootie Folding Bicycle, the Co-operative Wholesale Society (CWS) Commuter, and the Trusty Spacemaster.

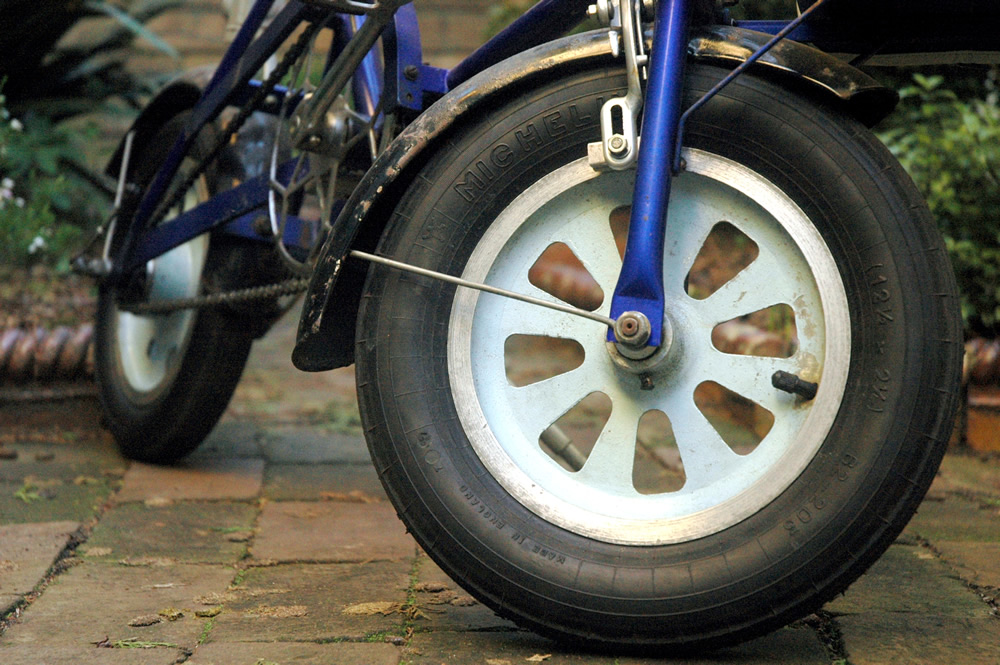
62-203 Michelin balloon tire on front wheel of 1960s Bootie Folding Cycle

==== Plus-size tires ====
A plus-size tire has a width of typically 2.5–3.25 inches (64–83 mm). Three bead seat diameters are available: 559 mm for 26+, 584 mm for 27.5+ (650B+), and 622 mm for 29+. They fill the gap between balloon and fat tires.

==== Fat tires ====
A fat tire is a type of wide oversized bicycle tire, typically 3.8 in (97 mm) or larger and rims 2.6 in (66 mm) or wider, designed for low ground pressure to allow riding on soft unstable terrain, such as snow, sand, bogs, and mud.

Since the 1980s, fat tires of width 3.8 to 5 in (97 to 127 mm), and diameters similar to conventional bicycle wheels, have been used on "fatbikes" and all-terrain bikes designed for riding in snow and sand.

=== Inflation pressure ===
The inflation pressure of bicycle tires ranges from 4.5 psi (0.31 bar; 31 kPa) for fat bike tires in snow to 220 psi (15 bar; 1.5 MPa) for tubular track racing tires. The maximum pressure rating of tires is usually stamped on the sidewall, indicated as "Maximum Pressure", or "Inflate to ..." or sometimes expressed as a range like "5–7 bar (73–102 psi; 500–700 kPa)". Decreasing pressure tends to increase traction and make the ride more comfortable while increasing pressure tends to make the ride more efficient and decreases the chances of getting pinch flats.

One published guideline for clincher inflation pressure is to pick the value for each wheel that produces a 15% reduction in the distance between the wheel rim and the ground when loaded (i.e. with the rider and cargo) compared to when unloaded. Pressures below this leads to increased rolling resistance and likelihood of pinch-flats. Pressures above this leads to less rolling resistance in the tire itself but to larger total energy dissipation caused by passing vibrations to the bike and especially the rider, which experience elastic hysterisis.

Inner tubes are not completely impermeable to air and slowly lose pressure over time. Butyl inner tubes hold pressure better than latex. Tires inflated from carbon dioxide canisters (often used for roadside repairs) or helium (occasionally used for elite track racing) lose pressure more quickly, because carbon dioxide, despite being a relatively large molecule, is slightly soluble in rubber, and helium is a very small atom which passes quickly through any porous material.

At least one public bicycle sharing system, London's Santander Cycles, is inflating tires with nitrogen, instead of simple air, which is already 78% nitrogen, in an attempt to keep the tires at the proper inflation pressure longer, though the effectiveness of this is debatable.

==== Effect of temperature ====
Since the volume of gas and the gas itself inside a tire is not altered significantly by a change of temperature, the ideal gas law states that the pressure of the gas should be directly proportional to the absolute temperature. Thus, if a tire is inflated to a gauge pressure of 4.00 bar (400 kPa; 58.0 psi) at room temperature, 20 °C (68 °F), the gauge pressure will increase to 4.34 bar (434 kPa; 62.9 psi) (+8.5%) at 40 °C (104 °F) and decrease to 3.66 bar (366 kPa; 53.1 psi) (-8.5%) at 0 °C (32 °F).

In the example above, a 7.0% difference in absolute temperature resulted in an 8.5% difference in tire pressure. This is a result of the difference between gauge pressure and absolute pressure. For low inflation pressures, this distinction is more important, as the ideal gas law applies to absolute pressure, including atmospheric pressure. For example, if a fat-bike tire is inflated to 0.50 bar (50 kPa; 7.3 psi) gauge pressure at room temperature 20 °C (68 °F) and then the temperature is decreased to −10 °C (14 °F) (a 10% decrease in absolute temperature), the absolute pressure of 1.50 bar (150 kPa; 21.8 psi) will be decreased by 10% to 1.35 bar (135 kPa; 19.6 psi), which translates to a 30% decrease in gauge pressure, to 0.35 bar (35 kPa; 5.1 psi).

==== Effect of atmospheric pressure ====
The net air pressure on the tire is the difference between the internal inflation pressure and the external atmospheric pressure, 1 bar (100 kPa; 15 psi), and most tire pressure gauges report this difference. If a tire is inflated to 4 bar (400 kPa; 58 psi) at sea level, the absolute internal pressure would be 5 bar (500 kPa; 73 psi) (+25%), and this is the pressure that the tire would need to contain if it were moved to a location with no atmospheric pressure, such as the vacuum of free space. At the highest elevation of commercial air travel, 12,000 metres (39,000 ft), the atmospheric pressure is reduced to 0.2 bar (20 kPa; 2.9 psi), and that same tire would have to contain 4.8 bar (480 kPa; 70 psi) (+20%).

==== Effect on carcass stress ====
Bicycle tires are essentially toroidal thin-walled pressure vessels and if the carcass is treated as a homogeneous and isotropic material then stress in the toroidal direction (longitudinal or axial stress if the tire is considered a long cylinder) can be calculated as:

$$\sigma_\text{toroidal} = \frac{pr}{2t}$$,

where:

- p is internal gauge pressure
- r is the inner, minor radius of the carcass
- t is thickness of the carcass

Stress in the poloidal direction (hoop or circumferential stress if the tire is considered a long cylinder) is more complicated, varying around the minor circumference and depending on the ratio between the major and minor radii, but if the major radius is much larger than the minor radius, as on most bicycle tires where the major radius is measure in hundreds of mm and the minor radius is measured in tens of mm, then stress in the Poloidal direction is close to the hoop stress of cylindrical thin-walled pressure vessels:

$$\sigma_\text{poloidal} = \frac{pr}{t}$$.

In reality, of course, the tire carcass is not homogeneous nor isotropic, but instead is a composite material with fibers imbedded in a rubber matrix, which complicates things further.

=== Rim width ===
While not strictly a tire parameter, the width of the rim on which any given tire is mounted has an influence on the size and shape of the contact patch, and possibly the rolling resistance and handling characteristics. The European Tyre and Rim Technical Organisation (ETRTO) publishes a guideline of recommended rim widths for different tire widths:

ETRTO approved rim width (mm) (2003 ed.)
tire width	straight rim width	crotchet rim width
18	-	13C
20	-	13C
23	16	13C-15C
25	16-18	13C-17C
28	16-20	15C-19C
32	16-20	15C-19C
35	18-22	17C-21C
37	18-22	17C-21C
40	20-24	19C-23C
44	20-27	19C-25C
47	20-27	19C-25C
50	22–30.5	21C-25C
54	27–30.5	25C-29C
57	27–30.5	25C-29C
62	30.5	29C

In 2006, it was expanded for allowing wide tires up to 50mm on 17C rims and 62mm on 19C rims. Ideally, the tire width should be 1.8 to 2 times the rim width, but a ratio from 1.4 to 2.2 should fit, and even 3 for hooked rims.

=== Tire pressure versus width ===
Mavic recommends maximum pressures in addition to rim width, and Schwalbe recommends specific pressures:

Schwalbe and Mavic pressure recommendations
tire width	Schwalbe rec.	Mavic max.	rim
18 mm (0.71 in)		10.0 bars (145 psi)	13C
20 mm (0.79 in)	9.0 bars (131 psi)	9.5 bars (138 psi)	13C
23 mm (0.91 in)	8.0 bars (116 psi)	9.5 bars (138 psi)	13C-15C
25 mm (0.98 in)	7.0 bars (102 psi)	9.0 bars (131 psi)	13C-17C
28 mm (1.1 in)	6.0 bars (87 psi)	8.0 bars (116 psi)	15C-19C
32 mm (1.3 in)	5.0 bars (73 psi)	6.7 bars (97 psi)	15C-19C
35 mm (1.4 in)	4.5 bars (65 psi)	6.3 bars (91 psi)	17C-21C
37 mm (1.5 in)	4.5 bars (65 psi)	6.0 bars (87 psi)	17C-23C
40 mm (1.6 in)	4.0 bars (58 psi)	5.7 bars (83 psi)	17C-23C
44 mm (1.7 in)	3.5 bars (51 psi)	5.2 bars (75 psi)	17C-25C
47 mm (1.9 in)	3.5 bars (51 psi)	4.8 bars (70 psi)	17C-27C
50 mm (2.0 in)	3.0 bars (44 psi)	4.5 bars (65 psi)	17C-27C
54 mm (2.1 in)	2.5 bars (36 psi)	4.0 bars (58 psi)	19C-29C
56 mm (2.2 in)	2.2 bars (32 psi)	3.7 bars (54 psi)	19C-29C
60 mm (2.4 in)	2.0 bars (29 psi)	3.4 bars (49 psi)	19C-29C
63 mm (2.5 in)		3.0 bars (44 psi)	21C-29C
66 mm (2.6 in)		2.8 bars (41 psi)	21C-29C
71 mm (2.8 in)		2.5 bars (36 psi)	23C-29C
76 mm (3.0 in)		2.1 bars (30 psi)	23C-29C

Fatbike tires of 100 to 130 mm (4 to 5 inches) width are typically mounted on 65 to 100 mm rims.

=== Forces and moments generated ===
Bicycle tires generate forces and moments between the wheel rim and the pavement that can affect bicycle performance, stability, and handling.

==== Vertical force ====
The vertical force generated by a bicycle tire is approximately equal to the product of inflation pressure and contact patch area. In reality, it is usually slightly more than this because of the small but finite rigidity of the sidewalls.

The vertical stiffness, or spring rate, of a bicycle tire, as with motorcycle and automobile tires, increases with inflation pressure.

==== Rolling resistance ====
Rolling resistance is a complex function of vertical load, inflation pressure, tire width, wheel diameter, the materials and methods used to construct the tire, roughness of the surface on which it rolls, and the speed at which it rolls. Rolling resistance coefficients may vary from 0.002 to 0.010, and have been found to increase with vertical load, surface roughness, and speed. Conversely, increased inflation pressure (up to a limit), wider tires (compared to narrower tires at the same pressure and of the same material and construction), larger-diameter wheels, thinner casing layers, and more-elastic tread material all tend to decrease rolling resistance.

For example, a study at the University of Oldenburg found that Schwalbe Standard GW HS 159 tires, all with a width of 47 mm and an inflation pressure of 300 kPa (3.0 bar; 44 psi), but made for various diameter rims, had the following rolling resistances:

ISO Size	Tire diameter (mm)	Crr
47-305	351	0.00614
47-406	452	0.00455
47-507	553	0.00408
47-559	605	0.00332
47-622	668	0.00336

The author of the cited paper concludes, based on the data presented therein, that Crr is inversely proportional to inflation pressure and to wheel diameter.

Although increasing inflation pressure tends to decrease rolling resistance because it reduces tire deformation, on rough surfaces increasing inflation pressure tends to increase the vibration experienced by the bicycle and rider, where that energy is dissipated in their less-than-perfectly inelastic deformation. Thus, depending on the myriad of factors involved, increasing inflation pressure can lead to increasing total energy dissipation and either slower speed or higher energy consumption.

==== Cornering force and camber thrust ====
As with other pneumatic tires, bicycle tires generate cornering force that varies with slip angle and camber thrust that varies with camber angle. These forces have been measured by several researchers since the 1970s, and have been shown to influence bicycle stability.

==== Moments ====
Moments generated in the contact patch by a pneumatic tire include the self aligning torque associated with cornering force, twisting torque associated with camber thrust, both about a vertical axis, and an overturning moment about the roll axis of the bike.

== See also ==
- Inner tube
- Outline of cycling
- Outline of tires
- Valve stem
