= Lateral force variation =

Tires provide for steering, traction, braking, and load support by transmitting forces between the vehicle and the road. Lateral force variation (LFV) is a property of a tire that characterizes its dynamic behavior of these forces. High values of LFV for a given tire reflect a high level of manufacturing variations in the tire structure that will impart ride disturbances into the vehicle in the lateral, or steering, direction. LFV is measured according to processes specified by the ASTM International in ASTM F1806 – Standard Practice for Tire Testing.

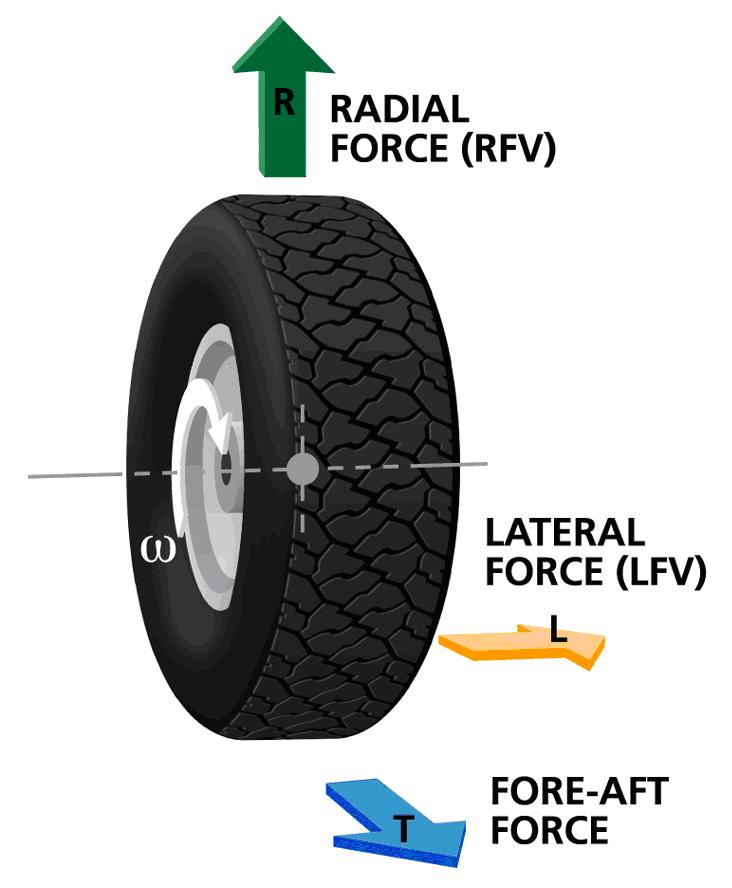
Force variation axes

LFV can best be explained by example. Assume a perfectly uniform tire mounted on a perfectly round wheel loaded with a constant force against a perfectly round test wheel. As the wheel turns, it turns the tire, and the tire carcass undergoes repeated deformation and recovery as it enters and exits the contact area. If we measure the lateral force between the tire and the wheel we will see zero change as the tire turns. If we now test a typical production tire we will see the lateral force vary as the tire turns.

Consider a good tire with LFV of 4 pounds. This tire will induce a 4 pound force sideways into the vehicle every rotation. The frequency of the force will increase in direct proportion to rotating speed. This effect will influence the steering of the vehicle. Tire makers test tires at the point of manufacture to verify that the LFV is within allowable quality limits. Tires that exceed these limits may be scrapped or sold to markets that do not require stringent quality.

== Waveform analysis ==
LFV is a complex waveform. It is expressed using several standard methods, including peak-to-peak, first harmonic, second harmonic, and higher-order harmonics. In production LFV testing these are reported as both magnitudes and angles.

== See also ==
- Cornering force
- Camber thrust
- Traction circle
