= Relaxation length =

Property of pneumatic tires

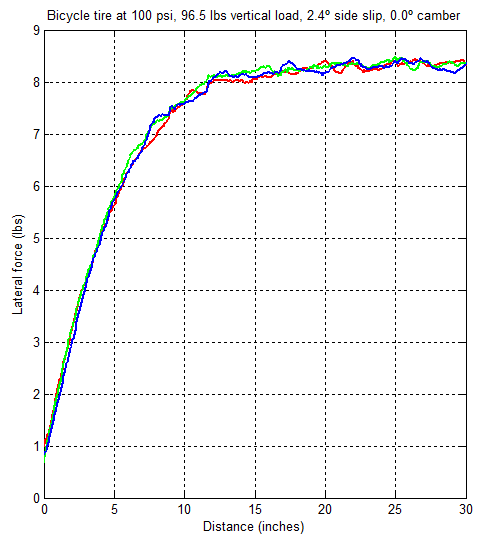
Plot showing lateral force building up as a bicycle tire rolls forward at a 2.4º slip angle. The results from three separate test runs are superimposed.

Relaxation length is a property of pneumatic tires that describes the delay between when a slip angle is introduced and when the cornering force reaches its steady-state value. It is also described as the distance that a tire rolls before the lateral force builds up to 63% of its steady-state value. It can be calculated as the ratio of cornering stiffness over the lateral stiffness, where cornering stiffness is the ratio of cornering force over slip angle, and lateral stiffness is the ratio of lateral force over lateral displacement.

== Values ==
Pacejka gives a rule of thumb that "at nominal vertical load the relaxation length is of the order of magnitude of the wheel radius". Relaxations lengths have been found to be between 0.12 and 0.45 meters, with higher values corresponding to higher velocities and heavier loads. Tests on motorcycle tires have found that the ratio of cornering stiffness over lateral stiffness produces values 20-25% higher than those calculated as 63% of the steady state-value. The relaxation length associated with camber thrust has been found to be nearly zero.

== Importance ==
A tire's relaxation length controls how much the tire will contribute to speed wobble.

== See also ==
- Bicycle and motorcycle dynamics
- Pneumatic trail
- Vehicle dynamics
