= Pneumatic trail =

Offset in tire force application point

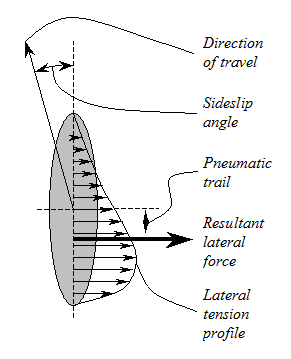
Bike tire contact patch during a right-hand turn

Pneumatic trail or trail of the tire is a trail-like effect generated by compliant tires rolling on a hard surface and subject to side loads, as in a turn. More technically, it is the distance that the resultant force of side-slip occurs behind the geometric center of the contact patch.

== Causes ==
Pneumatic trail is caused by the progressive build-up of lateral force along the length of the contact patch, such that lateral forces are greater towards the rear of the contact patch (though less so when the rear of the contact patch begins sliding) and this creates a torque on the tire called the self aligning torque. Because the direction of the side-slip is towards the outside of a turn, the force on the tire is towards the center of the turn. Therefore, this torque tends to turn the front wheel in the direction of the side-slip, away from the direction of the turn.

== Variation ==
Pneumatic trail is at its maximum when the slip angle is zero and decreases as slip angle increases. Pneumatic trail increases with vertical load.

== See also ==
- Bike physics
- Camber thrust
- Caster angle
- Cornering force
- Relaxation length
