= Slippery road training =

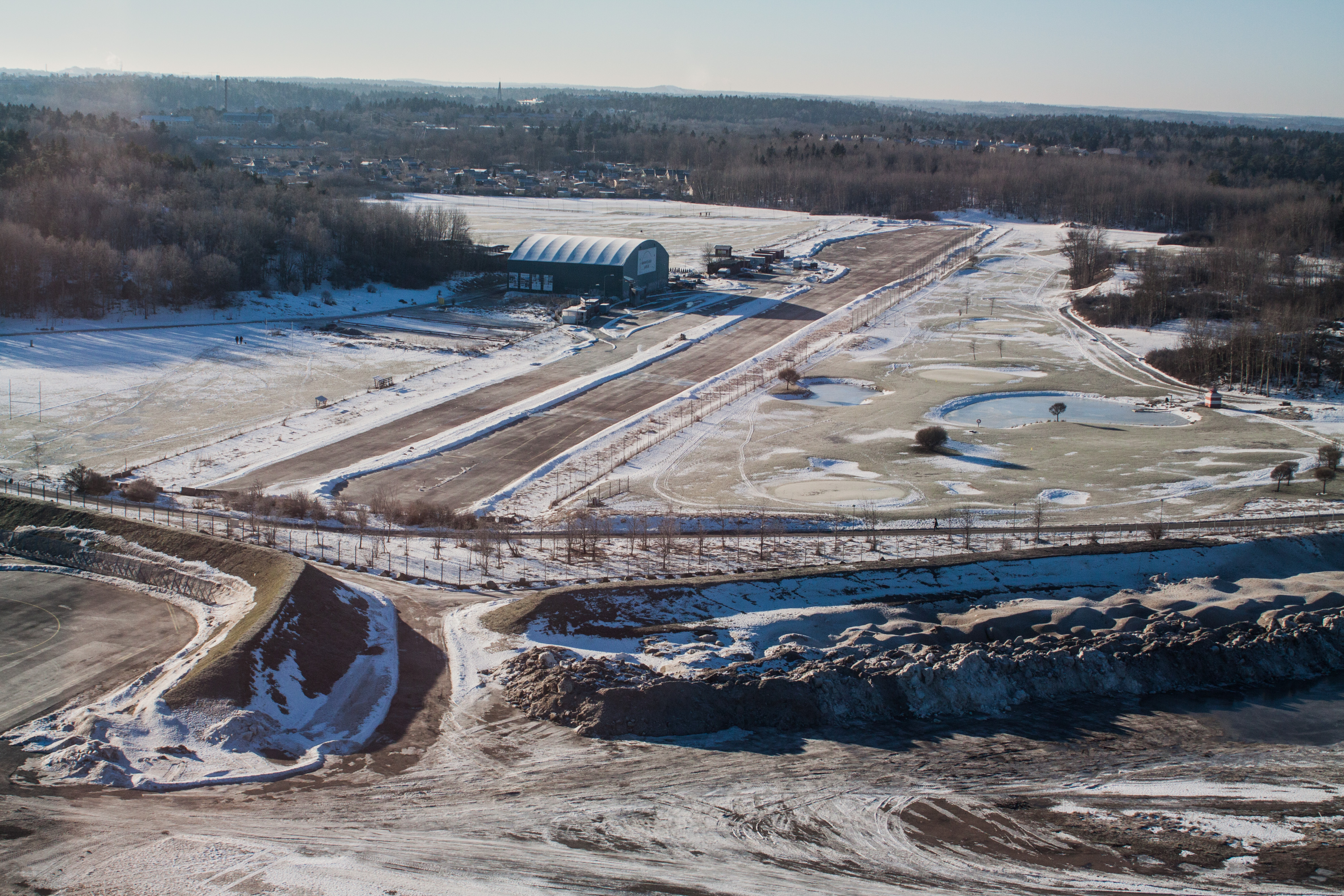
A slippery road track in Sweden (halkbana).

Slippery road training is the driving on a closed area with a slippery surface as a part of training road users in driving on slippery roads.

It is used in some countries as a mandatory prerequisite for a driving test, or by drivers who wish to practice their maneuvering skills in slippery conditions. Such training can also detect faults in the brakes or steering of a vehicle which can have a major impact on emergency maneuvers.

== Track construction ==
In order to be able to simulate wet icy conditions all year around, slippery tracks have traditionally been made using iron plates on the ground upon which an oil film is sprayed. On newer courses, epoxy is often used instead, which only needs to be applied with water to achieve the same effect.

== Training requirement for driving license ==
=== Norway ===
In Norway, slippery road training is a mandatory part of training which must be completed for everyone taking their driving test, and goes under the name glattkjøring (or officially: sikkerhetskurs på bane). The exam task consists of regaining control of the vehicle after skidding when braking or turning, as well as adapting driving behavior on slippery roads. A standard slippery track therefore has a long straight for braking, and a curve for turning training. Some courses also have a slippery slope. Normally, a slippery road also has markers in cardboard or similar soft material which can be remotely controlled by the driving instructor to simulate obstacles in the road that the driver must avoid (e.g. a running moose or pedestrians). The Norwegian Automobile Federation owns and operates 26 slippery road tracks in Norway.

== See also ==
- Skidpad
