= Skidpad =

Circular area of flat pavement used for various tests of a car's handling

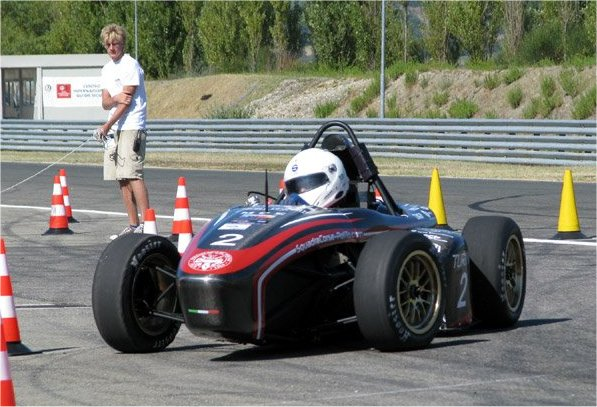
A Formula Student car performing a skidpad test. (2009)

A skidpad or skidpan is a circular area of flat pavement used for various tests of a car's handling. The most common skidpad use is testing lateral acceleration, measured in meters per second squared (m/s^{2}) or the scaled unit g-force. This usage has similarities to that of using a kick plate.

== Measurement of grip ==
A car's maximum g-force on a skid pad says something about the grip of the car on winding roads, or how fast it can drive in corners without losing grip. Some factors which can aid in achieving higher g-force are high power, wide tires, low mass, appropriate suspension setup and large downforce.

=== Test setup ===
The test is carried out on a circular track with a defined radius. A car driving on said track is slowly accelerated, until the outermost tires on the car begin to slip. Going any faster would cause the car to drive outside the defined radius. At this point, the speed of the car is recorded, and given the centripetal acceleration formula (by the formula v²/r, that is velocity squared divided by radius) the car's handling in terms of the maximum of lateral gs can be derived.

== Other uses and records ==
A new world record was accomplished in November 2020, when the Porsche Taycan set the Guinness World Records best mark for longest electric vehicle drift on the skidpad (measured in time). The car stayed sideways for 42 km (26 mi) in 55 minutes.

=== Formula Student ===
The world record for the fastest skidpad run in an official competition was achieved by TU Graz Racing from the Technical University of Graz. With a final time of 4.135 s at Formula Student East 2024, the team beat their old record of 4.355s, set at Formula Student Austria 2024, by 0.220s.

== See also ==
- Slippery road training
- Roadholding
- Cornering force
- Circle of forces
