= Cornering force =

Force produced by a vehicle tire during cornering

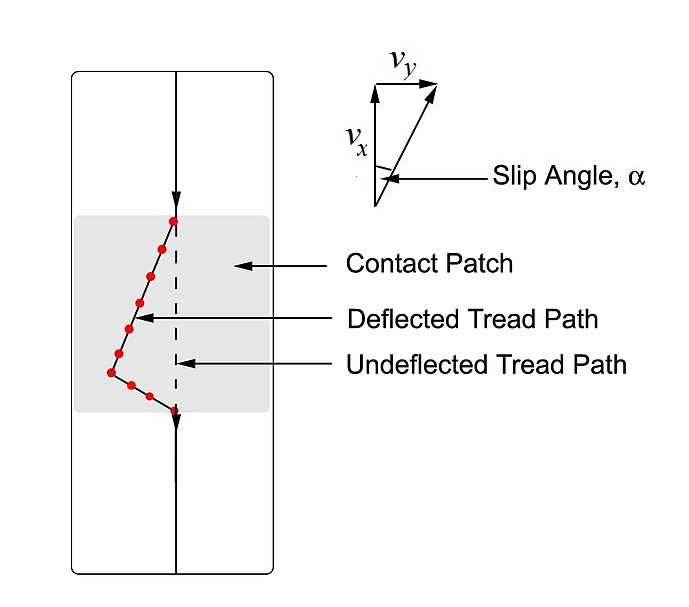
'Deflected' tread path, sideslip velocity and slip angle

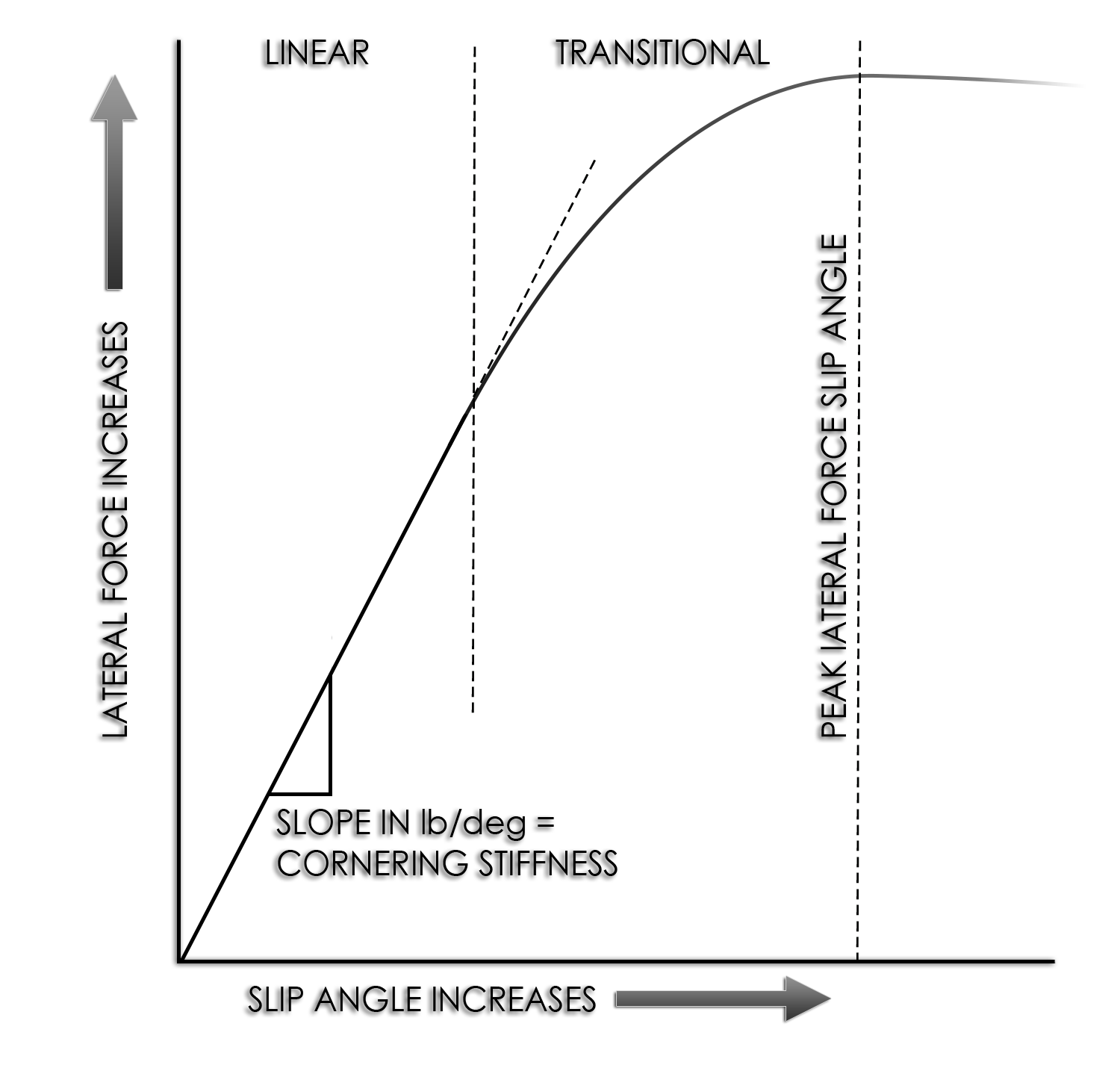
Graph of cornering force vs slip angle

Cornering force or side force is the lateral (i.e., parallel to wheel axis) force produced by a vehicle tire during cornering.

Cornering force is generated by tire slip and is proportional to slip angle at low slip angles. The rate at which cornering force builds up is described by relaxation length. Slip angle describes the deformation of the tire contact patch, and this deflection of the contact patch deforms the tire in a fashion akin to a spring.

As with deformation of a spring, deformation of the tire contact patch generates a reaction force in the tire; the cornering force. Integrating the force generated by every tread element along the contact patch length gives the total cornering force. Although the term, "tread element" is used, the compliance in the tire that leads to this effect is actually a combination of sidewall deflection and deflection of the rubber within the contact patch. The exact ratio of sidewall compliance to tread compliance is a factor in tire construction and inflation pressure.

Because the tire deformation tends to reach a maximum behind the center of the contact patch, by a distance known as pneumatic trail, it tends to generate a torque about a vertical axis known as self aligning torque.

The diagram is misleading because the reaction force would appear to be acting in the wrong direction. It is simply a matter of convention to quote positive cornering force as acting in the opposite direction to positive tire slip so that calculations are simplified, since a vehicle cornering under the influence of a cornering force to the left will generate a tire slip to the right.

The same principles can be applied to a tire being deformed longitudinally, or in a combination of both longitudinal and lateral directions. The behaviour of a tire under combined longitudinal and lateral deformation can be described by a traction circle.

== See also ==
- Camber thrust
- Lateral force variation
- Circle of forces
- Skidpad
