= Slip (vehicle dynamics) =

Motion between surfaces

In (automotive) vehicle dynamics, slip describes the relative motion between a tire and the road surface it is moving on. This slip can be generated either by the tire's angular velocity being greater or less than the free-rolling speed (referred to as slip ratio), or by the tire's front facing direction being at an angle to its direction of motion (referred to as slip angle). When both of these measurements do not equal zero, the tire enters a state called combined slip.

== Longitudinal slip ratio ==
Longitudinal slip (commonly referred to as slip ratio) describes the longitudinal angular state of a tire. Its formula is given as the ratio between the tire's slip velocity and the forward component of its linear velocity. Mathematically, its expressed as:

$$\sigma=\frac{ r_e\Omega - v_x }{|v_x|}$$

where $\Omega$ is the tire's angular velocity at the hub, $r_e$ is the effective radius from the hub to the center of the contact patch, and $v_x$ is the tire's forward velocity.

The numerator represents the slip velocity of the tire, which represents the change in longitudinal velocity needed to achieve an uninterrupted "free-rolling" state. ($r_e\Omega=v_x$)

A non-zero slip ratio indicates that the tire is creating a non-zero frictional force, moving the chassis. Generally, slip ratio is positive while driving, and negative while braking.

A slip ratio of zero indicates that the tire is free-rolling.

=== Low speed instabilities regarding explicit integrators ===
In simulations, particularly explicitly integrated simulations, low speed conditions yield unstable results. This is due to the denominator, $|v_x|$, approaching zero, which causes a singularity. A common solution is to "smoothen out" the jump in the curve by adding an additional epsilon parameter to the denominator. This is expressed as follows:

$\sigma=\frac{ r_e\Omega - v_x }{|v_x| + \epsilon}$

where $\epsilon$ is a negligible non-zero value greater than zero. This value will vary based on the simulation's step size.

== Lateral slip angle ==
The lateral slip of a tire is the angle between the direction it is moving and the direction it is pointing. This can occur, for instance, in cornering, and is enabled by deformation in the tire carcass and tread. Despite the name, no actual sliding is necessary for small slip angles. Sliding may occur, starting at the rear of the contact patch, as slip angle increases.

The slip angle can be defined as:

$$\alpha = \arctan\left(\frac{v_y}{|v_x|}\right)$$

== See also ==
- Contact patch
- Frictional contact mechanics
- Aristotle's wheel paradox
- Explanation with animation of the elastic slip website tec-science.com
