= Camber thrust =

Force from tire camber angle

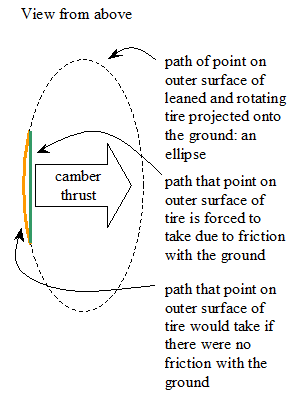

Camber thrust and camber force are terms used to describe the force generated perpendicular to the direction of travel of a rolling tire due to its camber angle and finite contact patch. Camber thrust is generated when a point on the outer surface of a leaned and rotating tire, that would normally follow a path that is elliptical when projected onto the ground, is forced to follow a straight path while coming in contact with the ground, due to friction. This deviation towards the direction of the lean causes a deformation in the tire tread and carcass that is transmitted to the vehicle as a force in the direction of the lean.

Camber thrust is approximately linearly proportional to camber angle for small angles, reaches its steady-state value nearly instantaneously after a change in camber angle, and so does not have an associated relaxation length. Bias-ply tires have been found to generate more camber thrust than radial tires. Camber stiffness is a parameter used to describe the camber thrust generated by a tire, and it is influenced by inflation pressure and normal load. The net camber thrust is usually in front of the center of the wheel and so generates a camber torque, twisting torque, or twisting moment. The orientation of this torque is such that it tends to steer a tire towards the direction that it is leaned. An alternate explanation for this torque is that the two sides of the contact patch are at different radii from the axle, and so would travel forward at different rates unless constrained by friction with the pavement.

== On bikes ==
On bicycles and motorcycles, camber thrust contributes to the centripetal force necessary to cause the vehicle to deviate from a straight path, along with cornering force due to the slip angle, can be the largest contributor, and in some cases is the sole contributor. Camber thrust contributes to the ability of bikes to negotiate a turn with the same radius as automobiles but with a smaller steering angle. When a bike is steered and leaned in the same direction, the camber angle of the front tire is greater than that of the rear and so can generate more camber thrust, all else being equal.

== On automobiles ==
On automobiles, camber thrust may contribute to or subtract from the total centripetal force generated by the tire, depending on the camber angle. On a well-aligned vehicle, camber thrust from the tires on each side balances out. On a surface rough enough for one front tire to momentarily lose traction, camber thrust from the other front tire can cause the vehicle to wander or feel skittish.

== See also ==
- Bicycle and motorcycle dynamics
- Cornering force
- Motorcycle tires
- Relaxation length
- Vehicle dynamics
