= Contact patch =

Portion of a tire that is in contact with the road

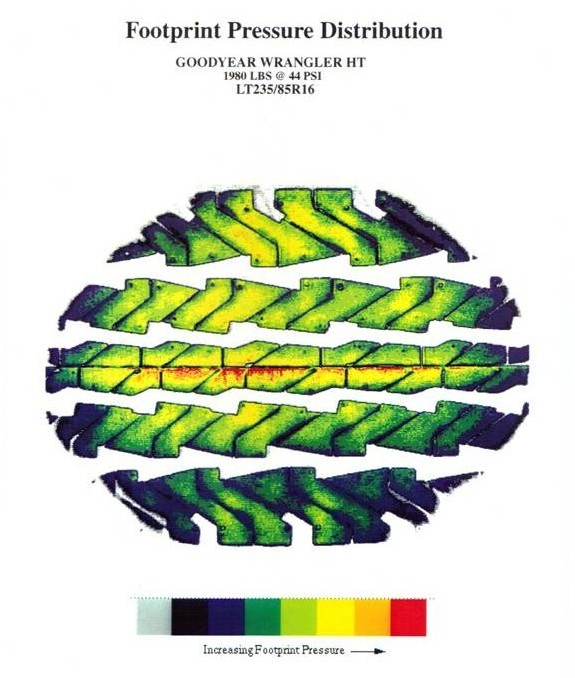
Colorized tire footprint pressure distribution

The contact patch is the portion of a vehicle's tire that is in actual contact with the road surface. It is commonly used in the discussion of pneumatic (i.e. pressurized) tires, where the term is used strictly to describe the portion of the tire's tread that touches the road surface. The term “footprint” is used almost synonymously. Solid wheels also exhibit a contact patch which is generally smaller than the pneumatic “footprint”.

== Contact patch size ==
The contact patch is the only connection between the road and the vehicle.

=== Pneumatic rubber tires ===
The size and shape of the contact patch, as well as the pressure distribution within the contact patch, are important to the ride qualities and handling characteristics of a vehicle. Since the wear characteristics of tires is a highly competitive area between tire manufacturers, a lot of the research done concerning the contact patch is considered highly proprietary and, therefore, very little is published on the subject.

Because pneumatic tires are flexible, the contact patch can be different when the vehicle is in motion than when it is static. Because it is so much easier to make observations of the contact patch without the tire in motion, it is more common to conduct studies of the static contact patch.

Statically, the size, shape, and pressure distribution are functions of many things, the most important of which are the load on the tire and the inflation pressure:

- The larger the load on the tire, the larger the contact patch.
- The larger the inflation pressure, the smaller the contact patch.

These two properties are not linearly proportional to the area of the contact. For example, a 10% change in load or inflation pressure usually does not result in a 10% change in the contact patch area because the load or pressure on a tire can be altered freely, and the contact patch area is affected by the tire geometry and stiffness. Further, the size of the contact patch cannot be simply calculated as load divided by inflation pressure, and the average contact pressure a tire has with the road surface is not equal to the inflation pressure.

=== Solid tires ===
The contact patch size of solid materials is described by the equations of contact mechanics. It is mainly related to the stiffness of the material in terms of Young's modulus.

=== Railroad steel wheel on rail ===
The contact patch of a railroad wheel is much smaller than for pneumatic rubber tires; it is only about the size of a dime (252 mm^{2}).

== See also ==
- Camber thrust
- Cornering force
- Frictional contact mechanics
- Ground pressure
- Pneumatic trail
- Slip (vehicle dynamics)
