= Two-mass-skate bicycle =

Theoretical bicycle model

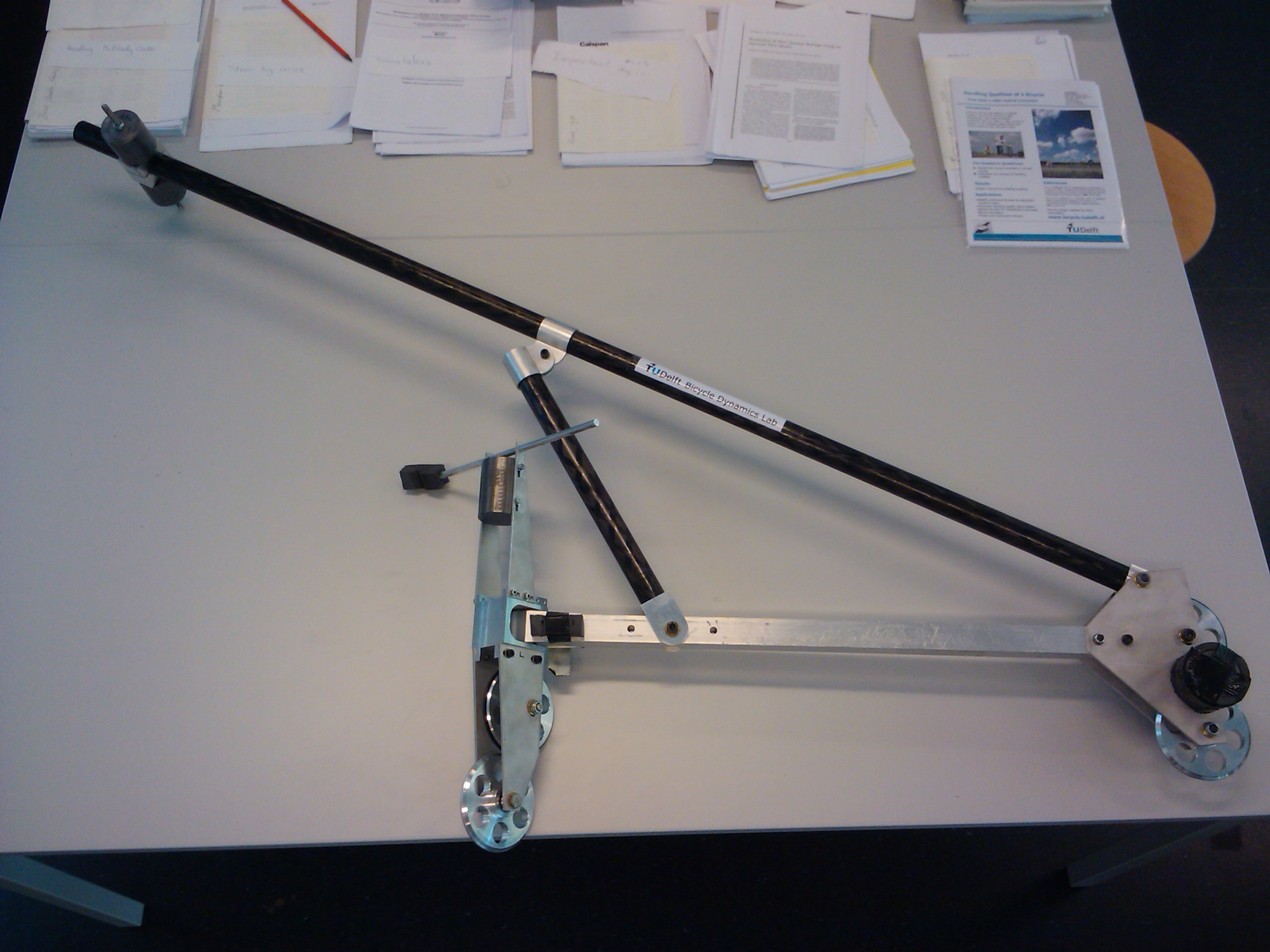
Photograph of a physical implementation

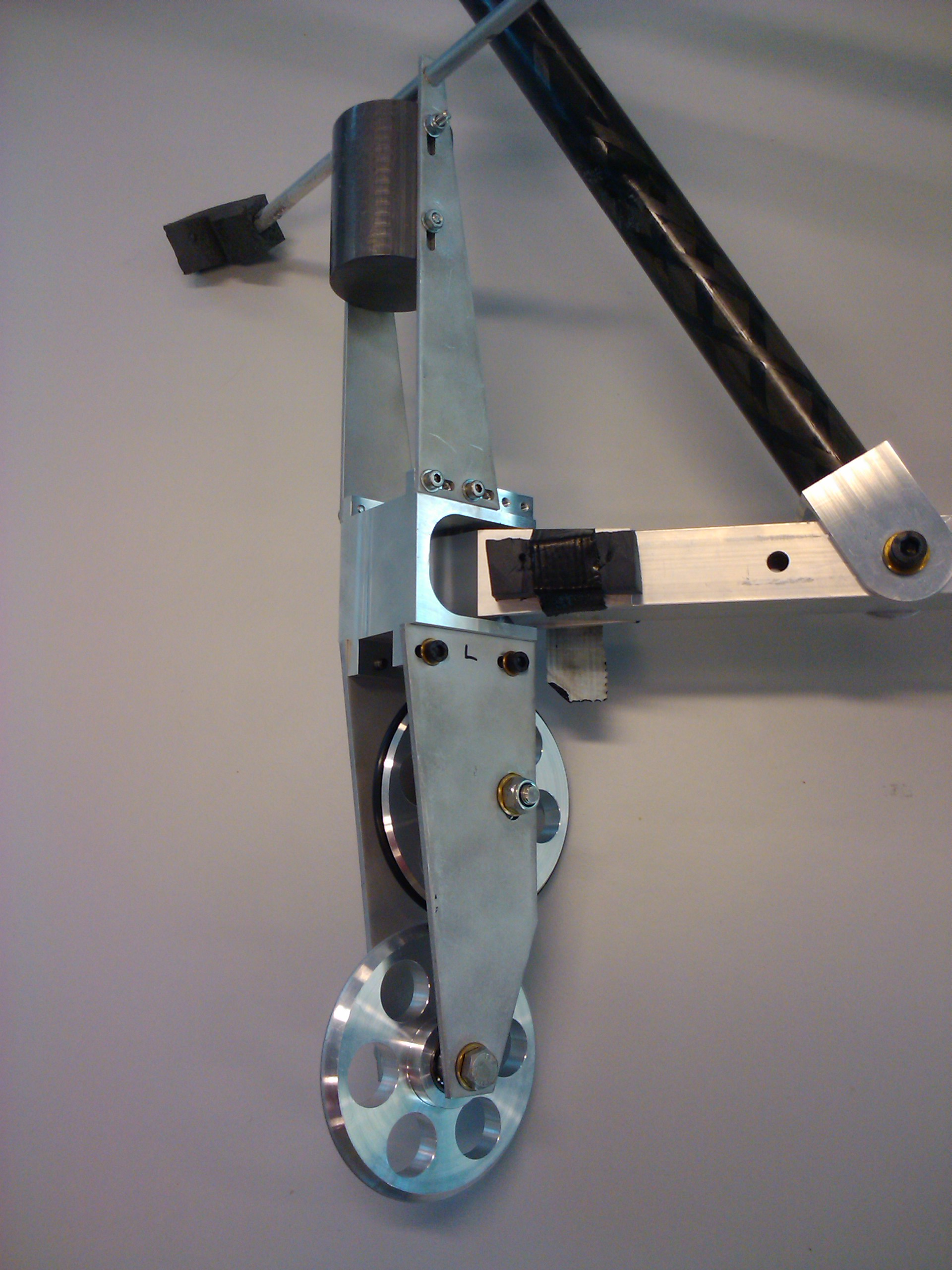
Detail of front end

A two-mass-skate bicycle (TMS) is a theoretical model created by a team of researchers at Cornell University, University of Wisconsin-Stout, and Delft University of Technology to show that it is neither sufficient nor necessary for a bike to have gyroscopic effects or positive trail to be self-stable. The two-mass and skate aspects of the model were chosen to eliminate design parameters so that the nine that remain, the locations of the masses and the steering geometry, could be more easily analyzed. Instead of full inertia tensors, the total mass of the bike is reduced to just two point masses, one attached to the rear frame and one attached to the front fork. Instead of rotating wheels, the non-holonomic ground contacts are provided by small-radius skates.

== History ==
The self-stability of bicycles was reported as early as 1876. Emmanuel Carvallo in 1897 and Francis Whipple in 1899 both developed equations of motion for a bicycle that showed this self-stability.

In 1970, David Jones explained in Physics Today how he experimented with a traditional bicycle to see if cancelling the gyroscopic effect of the front wheel would make it unridable. He added a second, counter-rotating front wheel that did not touch the ground. He reported that his particular bicycle would no longer stay up without a rider, but he could still easily ride it, and he could even just barely ride it no-handed. It was no longer self-stable, it was still controllable, but it was no longer easily controllable. Jones also tried increasing trail, by reversing the front fork, and found that self-stability was dramatically increased, but that this made it more difficult to ride - "it was too stable to be steered." Finally, he made a bike with negative trail, by adding forward extensions to the ends of the fork, and found that it had negligible self-stability and was "indeed very dodgy to ride, though not as impossible as [he] had hoped." By evaluating which modifications made a bicycle easy to ride, with hands on and off, Jones concluded that gyroscopic effects were less important than trail for bicycle stability.

The scientific and popular literature continued to report that positive trail, also called caster trail, was necessary for stability, although not always making a clear distinction between self-stability and controllability. The researchers who developed the two-mass skate bicycle focused solely on self-stability, although they do mention that "rider-controlled stability of bicycles is indeed related to their self-stability."

== Implications ==
The existence of the TMS and the self-stability it exhibits suggests that the design envelope of rideable bikes is larger than previously thought. For example, rear-wheel steering may not be as impossible as has been claimed. In the case of the TMS bike, the authors explain that the front assembly center of mass is lower than the rear frame center of mass – so it falls faster in a lean; and it is in front of the steering axis so it tends to steer the front end in the direction of the lean.

They conclude:

As a rule we have found that almost any selfstable bicycle can be made unstable by mis-adjusting only the trail, or only the front-wheel gyro, or only the front-assembly center-of-mass position. Conversely many unstable bicycles can be made stable by appropriately adjusting any one of these three design variables, sometimes in an unusual way.

== Physical implementation ==
A physical example has been created that closely approximates the TMS model and exhibits self-stability without gyroscopic effects from the wheels and without positive trail. Since point masses do not exist in nature, the model can only approximate them with pieces of dense material (lead), mounted on a frame of light materials (carbon fiber and aluminum). To prevent the bike with just two masses, as pictured above, from tipping forward, a third mass is located just above the rear wheel contact patch where it does not alter the dynamics. In place of skates, small-radius wheels that drive nearly identical counter-rotating wheels are used to provide the non-holonomic ground contact with minimal gyroscopic effect. This physical example closely mimics the self-stability of the theoretical model.

== See also ==
- Ice cycle
