= Countersteering =

Single-track vehicle steering technique

Countersteering is used by single-track vehicle operators, such as cyclists and motorcyclists, to initiate a turn toward a given direction by momentarily steering counter to the desired direction ("steer left to turn right"). To negotiate a turn successfully, the combined center of mass of the rider and the single-track vehicle must first be leaned in the direction of the turn, and steering briefly in the opposite direction causes that lean. The rider's action of countersteering is sometimes referred to as "giving a steering command".

The scientific literature does not provide a clear and comprehensive definition of countersteering. In fact, "a proper distinction between steer torque and steer angle ... is not always made."

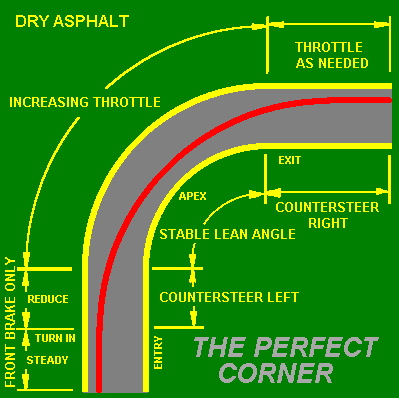
A hypothetical curve on dry asphalt

== How it works ==
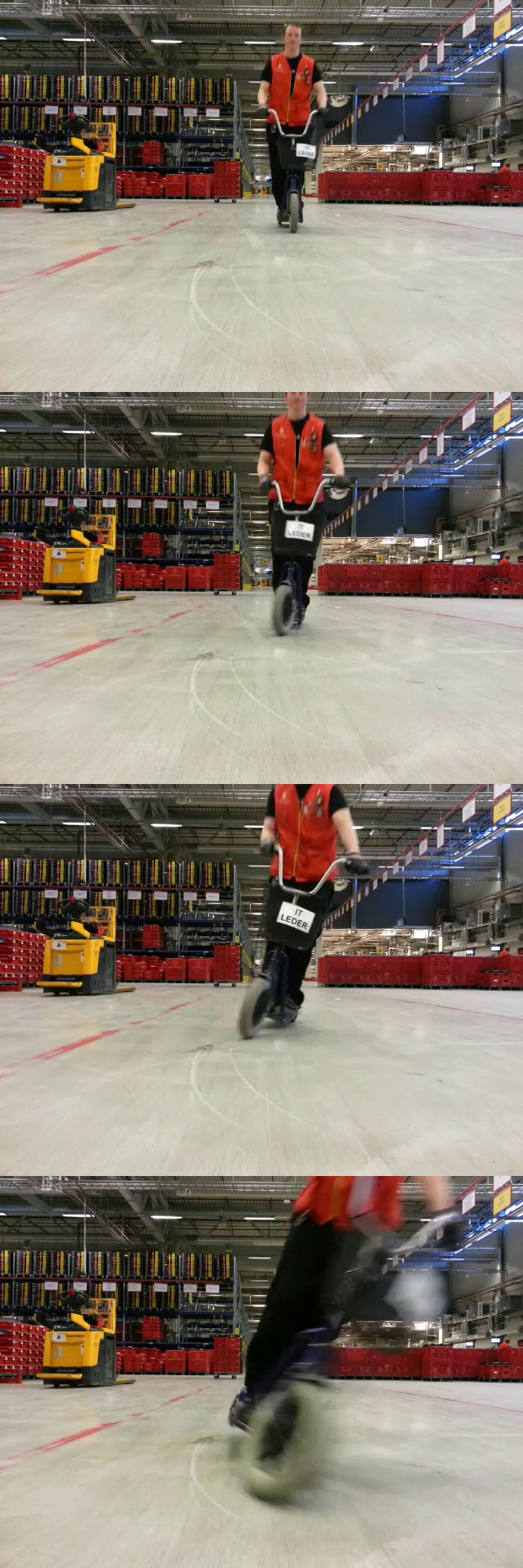
Image montage showing different stages of countersteering. Here, a scooter is countersteered to turn left.

In countersteering to turn right, the following is performed:

- A torque on the handlebars to the left is applied.
- The front wheel will then rotate about the steering axis to the left and the tire will generate forces in the contact patch to the left.
- The machine as a whole steers to the left.
- Because the forces in the contact patch are at ground level, this pulls the wheels "out from under" the bike to the left and causes it to lean to the right.
- The rider, or in most cases the inherent stability of the bike, provides the steering torque necessary to rotate the front wheel back to the right and in the direction of the desired turn.
- The bike begins a turn to the right.

While this appears to be a complex sequence of motions, it is performed by every child who rides a bicycle. The entire sequence goes largely unnoticed by most riders, which is why some assert that they do not do it.

It is also important to distinguish the steering torque necessary to initiate the lean required for a given turn from the sustained steering torque and steering angle necessary to maintain a constant radius and lean angle until it is time to exit the turn.

- The initial steer torque and angle are both opposite the desired turn direction.
- The sustained steer angle is in the same direction as the turn.
- The sustained steer torque required to maintain that steer angle is either with or opposite the turn direction depending on forward speed, bike geometry, and combined bike and rider mass distribution.

=== Need to lean to turn ===
A bike can negotiate a curve only when the combined center of mass of bike and rider leans toward the inside of the turn at an angle appropriate for the velocity and the radius of the turn:

$$\theta = \arctan \left (\frac{v^2}{gr}\right )$$

where $v$ is the forward speed, $r$ is the radius of the turn and $g$ is the acceleration of gravity.

Higher speeds and tighter turns require greater lean angles. If the mass is not first leaned into the turn, the inertia of the rider and bike will cause them to continue in a straight line as the tires track out from under them along the curve. The transition of riding in a straight line to negotiating a turn is a process of leaning the bike into the turn, and the most practical way to cause that lean (of the combined center of mass of bike and rider) is to move the support points in the opposite direction first.

=== Stable lean ===
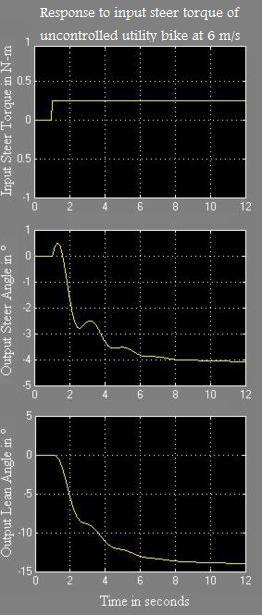
Graphs showing the lean and steer angle response of an otherwise uncontrolled simplified model of a typical bike, traveling at a forward speed in its stable range (in this case 6 m/s), to a positive steer torque (to the right) that begins as an impulse and then remains constant. It causes an initial steer angle to the right, a lean to the left, and eventually a steady-state lean to the left, steer angle to the left, and thus a turn to the left.

As the desired angle is approached, the front wheel must usually be steered into the turn to maintain that angle or the bike will continue to lean with gravity, increasing in rate, until the side contacts the ground. This process often requires little or no physical effort, because the geometry of the steering system of most bikes is designed in such a way that the front wheel has a strong tendency to steer in the direction of a lean.

The actual torque the rider must apply to the handlebars to maintain a steady-state turn is a complex function of bike geometry, mass distribution, rider position, tire properties, turn radius, and forward speed. At low speeds, the steering torque necessary from the rider is usually negative, that is opposite the direction of the turn, even when the steering angle is in the direction of the turn. At higher speeds, the direction of the necessary input torque often becomes positive, that is in the same direction as the turn.

=== At low speeds ===
At low speeds countersteering is equally necessary, but the countersteering is then so subtle that it is hidden by the continuous corrections that are made in balancing the bike, often falling below a just noticeable difference or threshold of perception of the rider. Countersteering at low speed may be further concealed by the ensuing much larger steering angle possible in the direction of the turn.

=== Gyroscopic effects ===
One effect of turning the front wheel is a roll moment caused by gyroscopic precession. The magnitude of this moment is proportional to the moment of inertia of the front wheel, its spin rate (forward motion), the rate that the rider turns the front wheel by applying a torque to the handlebars, and the cosine of the angle between the steering axis and the vertical.

For a sample motorcycle moving at 22 m/s (50 mph) that has a front wheel with a moment of inertia of 0.6 kgm^{2}, turning the front wheel one degree in half a second generates a roll moment of 3.5 Nm. In comparison, the lateral force on the front tire as it tracks out from under the motorcycle reaches a maximum of 50 N. This, acting on the 0.6 m (2 ft) height of the center of mass, generates a roll moment of 30 Nm.

While the moment from gyroscopic forces is only 12% of this, it can play a significant part because it begins to act as soon as the rider applies the torque, instead of building up more slowly as the wheel out-tracks. This can be especially helpful in motorcycle racing.

== Motorcycles ==
Deliberately countersteering is essential for safe motorcycle riding, and as a result is generally a part of safe riding courses run by organisations like the Motorcycle Safety Foundation, the Canada Safety Council, or Australian Q-Ride providers. Deliberately countersteering a motorcycle is a much more efficient way to steer than to just lean. At higher speeds the self-balancing property of the bike gets stiffer, and a given input force applied to the handlebars produces smaller changes in lean angle.

=== Training ===
Much of the art of motorcycle cornering is learning how to effectively push the grips into corners and how to maintain proper lean angles through the turn. When the need for a quick swerve to one side suddenly arises in an emergency, it is essential to know, through prior practice, that countersteering is the most efficient way to change the motorcycle's course. Many accidents result when otherwise experienced riders who have never carefully developed this skill encounter an unexpected obstacle.

To encourage an understanding of the phenomena around countersteering, the phrase positive steering is sometimes used. Other phrases are "PRESS – To turn, the motorcycle must lean", "To lean the motorcycle, press on the handgrip in the direction of the turn" or "Press left – lean left – go left".

The Motorcycle Safety Foundation teaches countersteering to all students in all of its schools, as do all motorcycle racing schools. Countersteering is included in United States state motorcycle operator manuals and tests, such as Washington, New Jersey, California, and Missouri.

=== Safety ===
According to the Hurt Report, most motorcycle riders in the United States would over-brake and skid the rear wheel and under-brake the front when trying hard to avoid a collision. The ability to countersteer and swerve was essentially absent with many motorcycle operators. The often small amount of initial countersteering input required to get the bike to lean, which may be as little as 0.125 seconds, keeps many riders unaware of the concept.

== Multi-track vehicles ==
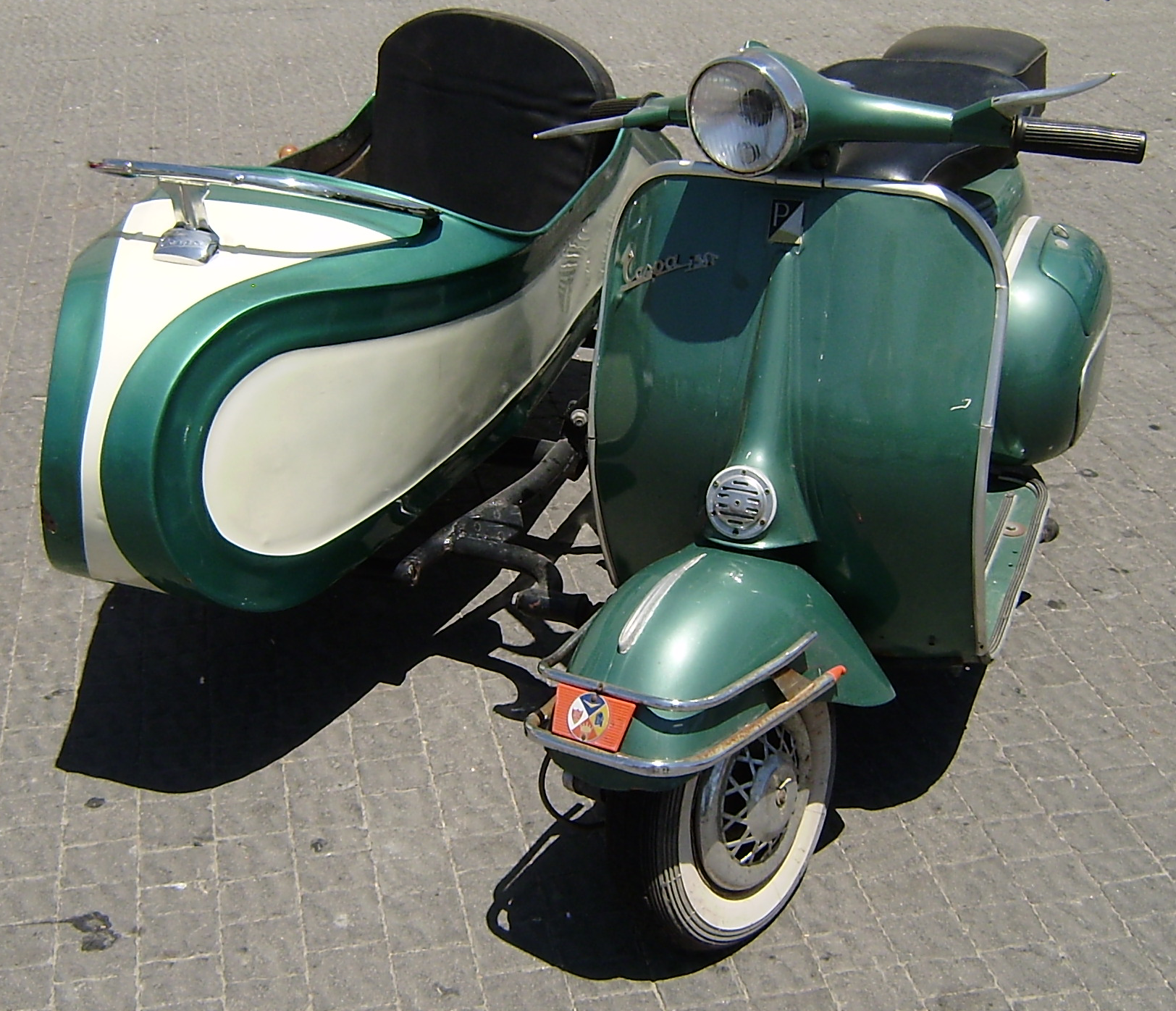
Sidecar on Vespa scooter

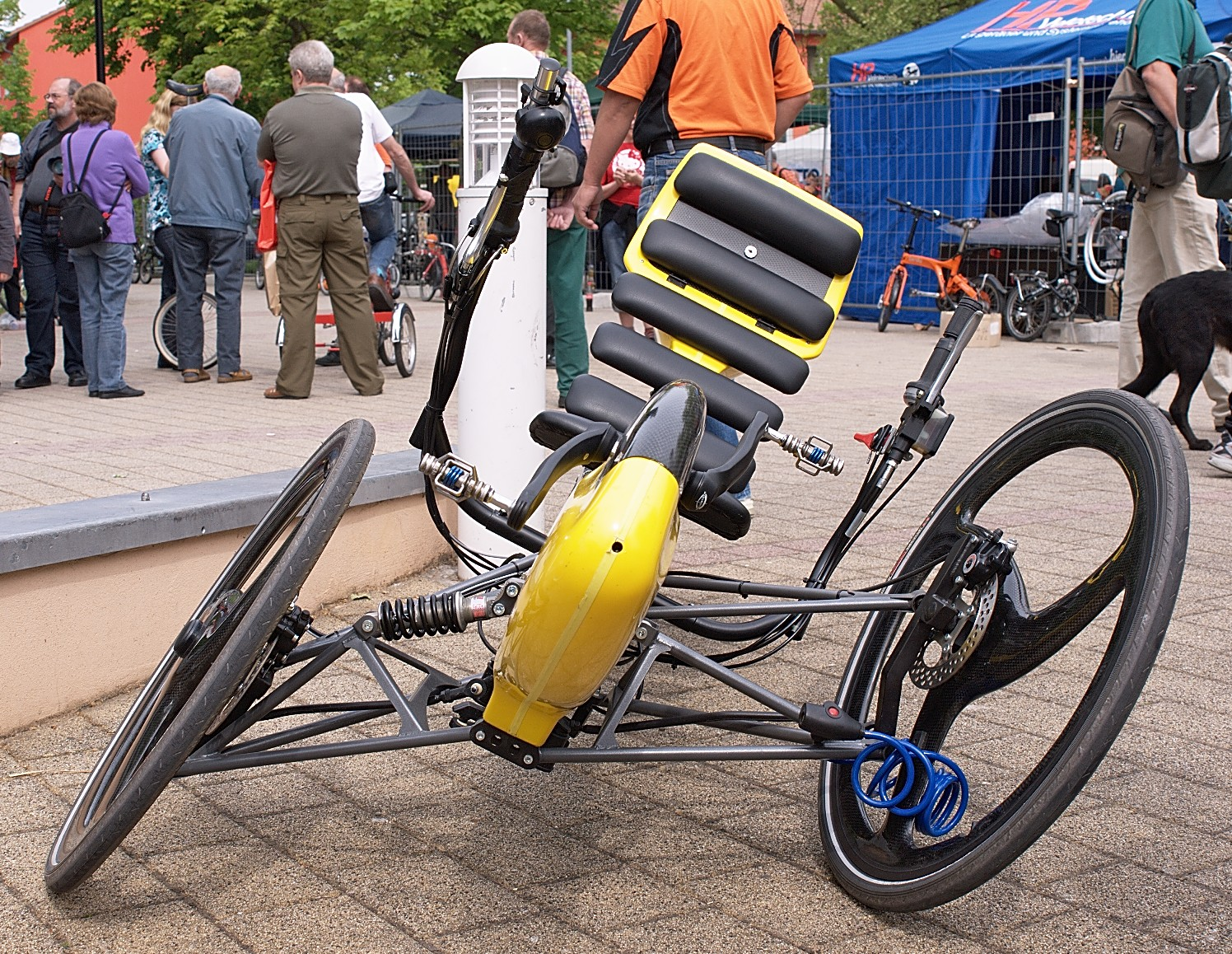
Tripendo recumbent tricycle, a tilting three-wheeler

Three wheeled motorcycles without the ability to lean have no need to be countersteered, and an initial steer torque in one direction does not automatically result in a turn in the other direction. This includes sidecar rigs where the car is rigidly mounted on the bike. The three wheeled BRP Can-Am Spyder Roadster uses two front wheels which do not lean, and so it steers like a car.

Some sidecars allow the motorcycle to lean independent of the sidecar, and in some cases, the sidecar even leans in parallel with the motorcycle. These vehicles must be countersteered the same way as a solo motorcycle. The three wheel Piaggio MP3 uses mechanical linkages to lean the two front wheels in parallel with the rear frame, and so that it is countersteered in the same manner as a two-wheeled motorcycle.

Free-leaning multi-track vehicles must be balanced by countersteering before turning. Multi-track leaning vehicles that are forced-tilted, such as the Carver, are tilted without countersteering the control and are not balanced by the operator. Later versions of the Carver introduced automatic countersteer to increase tilt speed and reduce the force required to tilt the vehicle. Other forced-tilted vehicles may incorporate automatic countersteering. A prototype tilting multi-track free leaning vehicle was developed in 1984 that employs automatic countersteering and does not require any balancing skills.

== Countersteering by weight shifting ==
With a sufficiently light bike (especially a bicycle), the rider can initiate a lean and turn without using the handlebars by shifting body weight, called counter lean by some authors. Documented physical experimentation shows that on heavy bikes (many motorcycles) shifting body weight is less effective at initiating leans.

The following is done when countersteering using weight shifting to turn left:

- The rider applies a momentary torque, either at the seat via the legs or in the torso that causes the bike itself to lean to the right.
- The combined center of mass of the bike and rider is only lowered and not moved out, but if the front of the bike is free to swivel about its steering axis, the lean to the right will cause it to steer to the right by some combination of gyroscopic precession, ground reaction forces, gravitational force on an off-axis center of mass or simply the inertia of an off-axis center of mass depending on the exact geometry and mass distribution of the particular bike and the amount of torque and the speed at which it is applied.
- This countersteering to the right causes the ground contact to move to the right of the center of mass, as the bike moves forward, thus generating a leftward lean. Finally the front end steers to the left and the bike enters the left turn.

The amount of leftward steering necessary to balance the leftward lean appropriate for the forward speed and radius of the turn is controlled by the torque generated by the rider, again either at the seat or in the torso.

To straighten back out of the turn, the rider simply reverses the procedure for entering it: cause the bike to lean farther to the left; this causes it to steer farther to the left, which moves the wheel contact patches farther to the left, eventually reducing the leftward lean and exiting the turn.

A National Highway Traffic Safety Administration study showed that rider lean has a larger influence on a lighter motorcycle than a heavier one, which helps explain why no-hands steering is less effective on heavy motorcycles. Leaning the torso with respect to the bike does not cause the bike to lean far enough to generate anything but the shallowest turns. No-hands riders may be able to keep a heavy bike centered in a lane and negotiate shallow highway turns, but not much else.

Complex maneuvers are not possible using weight shifting alone because even for a light machine there is insufficient control authority. Although on a sufficiently light bike (especially a bicycle), the rider can initiate a lean and turn by shifting body weight, there is no evidence that complex maneuvers can be performed by bodyweight alone.

== Other uses ==
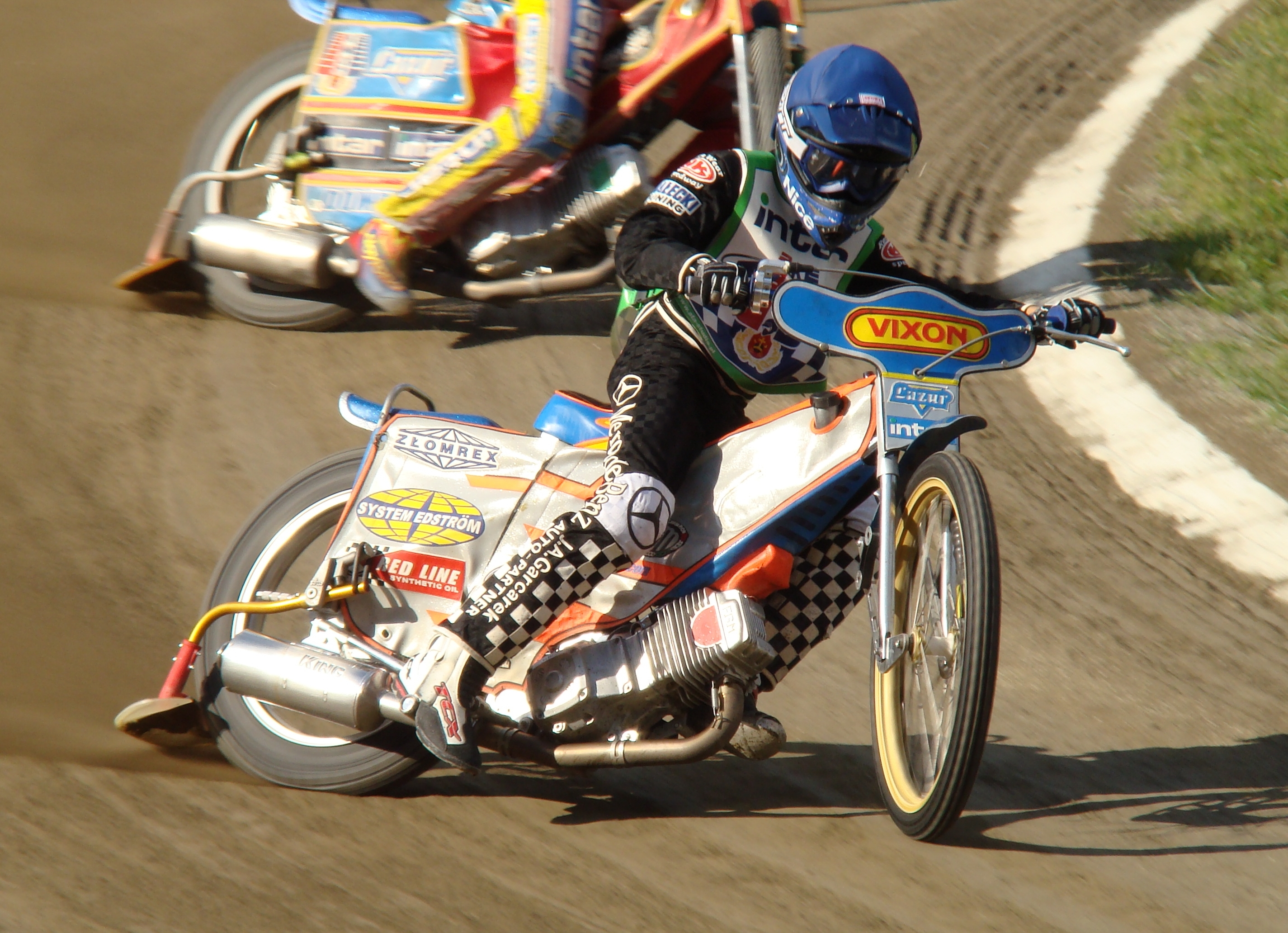
Motorcycle speedway racing

The term countersteering is also used by some authors to refer to the need on bikes to steer in the opposite direction of the turn (negative steering angle) to maintain control in response to significant rear wheel slippage. Motorcycle speedway racing takes place on an oval track with a loose surface of dirt, cinders or shale. Riders slide their machines sideways, powersliding or broadsiding into the turns, using an extreme form of this type of countersteering that is maintained throughout the turn. This also works, without power, for bicycles on loose or slippery surfaces, although it is an advanced technique.

The term is also used in the discussion of the automobile driving technique called drifting.

== The Wright Brothers ==
Wilbur Wright explained countersteering this way:

I have asked dozens of bicycle riders how they turn to the left. I have never found a single person who stated all the facts correctly when first asked. They almost invariably said that to turn to the left, they turned the handlebar to the left and as a result made a turn to the left. But on further questioning them, some would agree that they first turned the handlebar a little to the right, and then as the machine inclined to the left, they turned the handlebar to the left and as a result made the circle, inclining inward.

== See also ==
- Bicycle and motorcycle dynamics
- Motorcycle safety
- Non-minimum phase system
