= Emmanuel Carvallo =

French mathematician (1856–1945)

- Born: 17 October 1865
- Died: 30 January 1945 (aged 79)
- Scientific career
- Fields: Mathematics
- Thesis: Méthode pratique pour la résolution numérique complète des équations algébriques ou transcendantes (1890)

Emmanuel Carvallo (1856–1945) was a French mathematician born in Narbonne. He is notable for showing in 1897 that bicycles could be self-stable, for opposing wave models of X-rays in 1900, and for claiming in 1912 that Einstein's Theory of Relativity had been proven false.
