= David E. H. Jones =

British chemist and writer

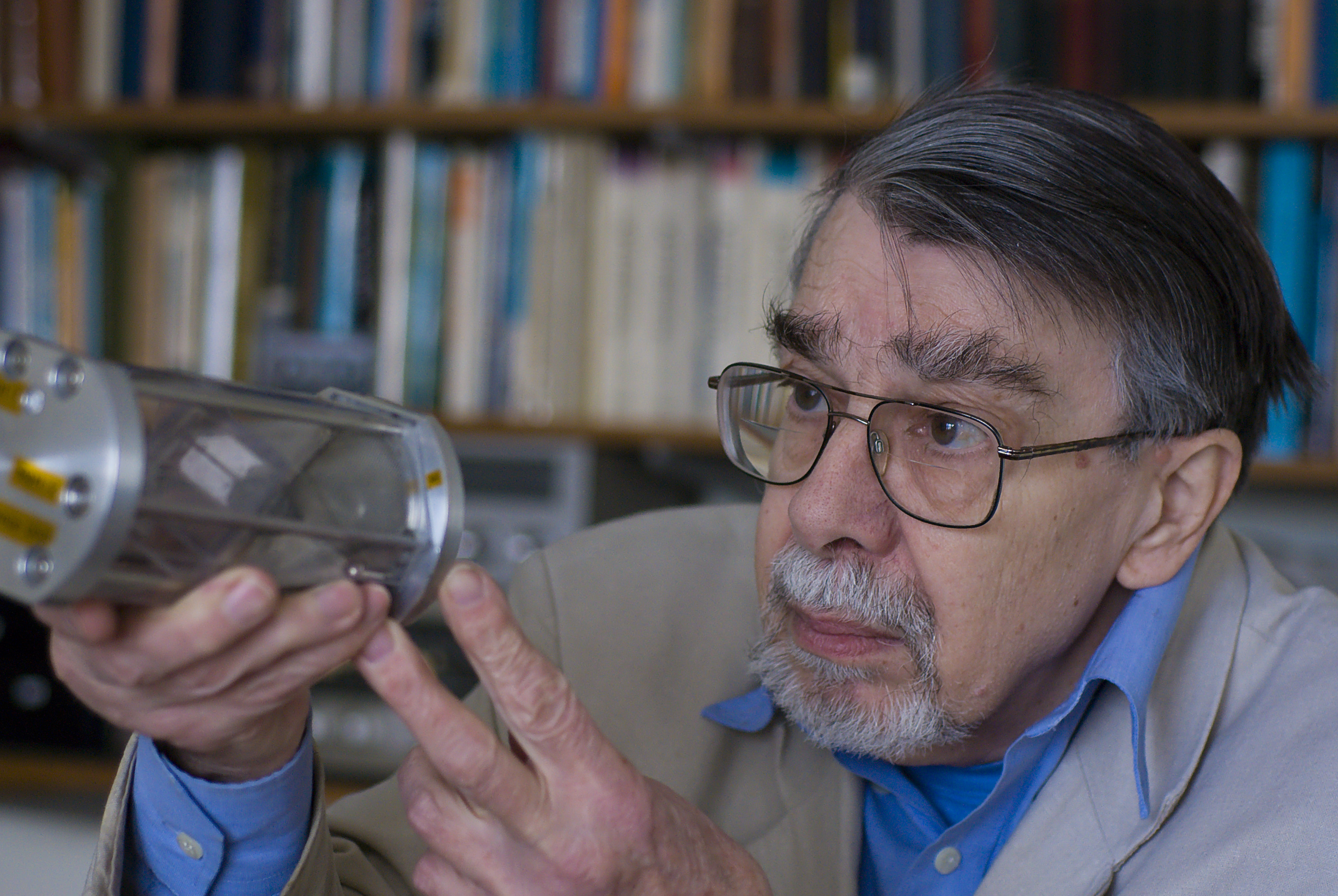
- Jones inspects the container for his chemical garden which NASA flew into space
- Born: David Edward Hugh Jones; 20 April 1938; Southwark, London, England
- Died: 19 July 2017 (aged 79); Newcastle upon Tyne, England, UK
- Education: Imperial College
- Known for: Daedalus, DREADCO, prediction of fullerenes, arsenic in Napoleon's wallpaper, chemical gardens in space, stability of the bicycle, fake perpetual motion machines, 3D printing
- Scientific career
- Fields: Chemistry
- Workplaces: University of Newcastle upon Tyne

David Edward Hugh Jones (20 April 1938 – 19 July 2017) was a British chemist and writer, who - under the pen name Daedalus - was the fictional inventor for DREADCO. Jones' columns as Daedalus were published for 38 years, starting weekly in 1964 in New Scientist. He then moved to the journal Nature, and continued to publish until 2002. Columns from these magazines, along with additional comments and implementation sketches, were collected in two books: The Inventions of Daedalus: A Compendium of Plausible Schemes (1982) and The Further Inventions of Daedalus (1999).

== Early life and education ==
He was born in Southwark, London. His father, Philip, was an advertising copywriter. His mother was Dorothea, née Sitters. He had one brother, Peter Vaughan Jones. He attended Crofton Primary School in Orpington, Kent, and then Eltham College.

His professional training was as a chemist. In 1962, he graduated in chemistry and completed a PhD in organic chemistry from Imperial College London.

== Career ==
Jones worked for a year for a company specialising in the design of laboratory equipment and then as a post-doctoral fellow at Imperial, where he worked on infrared spectroscopy and began his column for New Scientist. In 1967, he took up a post as an assistant lecturer at the University of Strathclyde. After one year he moved to Runcorn, Cheshire where he worked as a research scientist in spectroscopy for Imperial Chemical Industries. In 1974, he became the Sir James Knott Research Fellow at the University of Newcastle upon Tyne. He then became an independent science consultant to industry providing ideas, brainstorming services, and scientific demonstrations for television.

Some of his Daedalus inventions proved practical; about one-fifth of them were seriously proposed or even patented by others. His most notable scientific contribution as Daedalus was possibly his 1966 prediction of hollow carbon molecules, before buckminsterfullerene was made, and long before its synthesizers won a Nobel prize for the discovery of fullerenes. It is often claimed that the invention of 3D printing was in 1984 by Chuck Hull, but Jones in his Daedalus persona laid out the concept in New Scientist in 1974, 10 years earlier. He was an early proposer of a space elevator (1964) and of archaeoacoustics (1969).

Beyond Daedalus, in scientific circles he is known for his study of bicycle stability, his determination of arsenic in Napoleon's wallpaper, and for having designed and flown on the Space Shuttle a microgravity experiment to grow a chemical garden.

He is also known for his series of fake perpetual motion machines, one of which is in the Technisches Museum Wien. In 2009, a documentary film about his work and inventions, Perpetual Motion Machine, was made and shown at the Newcastle Science Festival 2010.

He was known in Germany as a regular guest on the 1980s TV science quiz show Kopf um Kopf (Head to Head), presenting interesting physics experiments.

== Personal life ==
In 1972, he married Jane Burgess. The marriage lasted a year, and he later had a long relationship with the artist Naomi Hunt.

He died in 2017 from prostate cancer.

== Bibliography ==
- The Inventions of Daedalus: A Compendium of Plausible Schemes, (1982) W. H. Freeman; ISBN 0-7167-1412-4
- The Further Inventions of Daedalus, (1999) Oxford University Press ISBN 0-19-850469-1
- The Aha! Moment: A Scientist's Take on Creativity (2011) Johns Hopkins University Press ISBN 978-1421403311
- Why Are We Conscious?: A Scientist's Take on Consciousness and Extrasensory Perception (2017) CRC Press ISBN 1351681311,ISBN 9781351681315
