= David Limebeer =

British engineer

David John Noel Limebeer
- Born: 31 July 1952
- Education: Michaelhouse; University of the Witwatersrand; University of Natal; University of London
- Known for: Contributions to electrical machines, robust control and vehicle dynamics
- Awards: FREng; IEEE
- Scientific career
- Fields: Control engineering and vehicle dynamics
- Workplaces: University of Cambridge; Imperial College London; University of Oxford
- Thesis: Analysis and control of AC rotating machines in the presence of series capacitor compensated transmission networks (1980)
- Doctoral advisor: Ronald G. Harley

David John Noel Limebeer (born 31 July 1952) is an electrical engineer and academic. He is an Emeritus Professor of Control Engineering at the University of Oxford and a Distinguished Professor at the University of the Witwatersrand. He is also an Emeritus Professorial Fellow at New College, Oxford.

Limebeer is known for his contributions in engineering dynamics, with his contributions spanning electrical machines, robust control theory, and vehicle dynamics. He has published numerous peer-reviewed articles and books, including Linear Robust Control (with Michael Green), and Dynamics and Optimal Control of Road Vehicles (with Matteo Massaro). He is the recipient of two South African Institute of Electrical Engineers Prizes and award certificates, the University of Hong Kong William Mong Distinguished Lecture prize, and the 2019 Honeywell International Medal from the Institute of Measurement and Control. He is A1 rated with the South African National Research Foundation.

Limebeer is a Fellow of the Royal Academy of Engineering, the Institute of Electrical Engineers, the South African Academy of Engineering, the City and Guilds of London Institute, and is a Life Fellow of the Institute of Electrical and Electronics Engineers.

== Education ==
Limebeer obtained his B.Sc.in engineering from the University of the Witwatersrand in 1974 and then attended the University of Natal from 1975 to 1980, where he received his M.Sc. in engineering and a PhD degree. From 1980 to 1984, he was a post-doctoral fellow at the University of Cambridge. He earned a D.Sc. in engineering from the University of London in 1992, and a MA degree from the University of Oxford in 2009 (conferred by resolution).

== Career ==
Limebeer joined Imperial College London in 1984 as a lecturer in the Department of Electrical and Electronic Engineering, was promoted to Reader in 1989, Professor in 1993 and served as Head of the department between 1999 and 2008. He was Professor of Control Engineering at the University of Oxford between 2008 and 2019, where he was also a Professorial Fellow at New College (Oxford). Since 2019, he has been an Emeritus Professor of Control Engineering at the University of Oxford and an Emeritus Professorial Fellow at New College. Following his retirement and return to South Africa, where he held emeritus positions at the University of Pretoria and the University of Johannesburg. Since 2021 he has been serving as a Distinguished Professor at the University of the Witwatersrand.

Limebeer has acted as an expert witness in several product liability, accident investigation, and patent cases. He has also consulted for several Formula One, MotoGP and NASCAR teams.

He has held a number of editorial positions, including Associate Editor for Systems and Control Letters, an Editor for Automatica, and serves as an Editorial Board Member for Multibody System Dynamics.

== Research ==
Limebeer's research covers both theoretical and applied contributions to control engineering and dynamic systems. These include contributions to the understanding and prevention of subsynchronous resonance (SSR) in electrical machines, robust control and the dynamics of road vehicles including bicycles, motorcycles, and Formula One and NASCAR specification race cars.

=== Subsynchronous resonance (SSR) ===
SSR is an electro-mechanical resonance phenomenon that occurs in alternating-current (AC) machines when series capacitor compensation is included in the motor’s power supply. Limebeer’s work includes the design, operation, and limitations of passive-SSR suppression filters. He also explored SSR in induction motors with series capacitor compensated feeders, this work revealed improved starting time and voltage regulation, with unstable speed bands in both single-cage, and deep-bar motors.

=== Robust control ===
Robust control aims to achieve adequate performance and/or stability in the presence of modelling errors. Having considered the central problem of finding low-order robust controllers in the 1980s, Limebeer established that low-order controllers exist; and also contributed to the solution of the optimal case. In the periodically time-varying case, he explored the robust control of a satellite in a three-dimensional "halo" orbit and introduced a quantifiable robust stability margin that maintains the orbit while also ensuring robust stability. Much of this work is summarized in the textbook Linear Robust Control (with M. Green).

=== Vehicle dynamics ===
Another aspect of Limebeer's research is his work on motorcycle and race car dynamics. Working with Robin S. Sharp, he developed computational methods for finding vehicle models, that were later made into the commercial software product BikeSim. Prompted by the introduction in 2014 of fuel-saving regulations into Formula One, he studied the use of optimal control in closed-circuit racing, emphasizing the optimal deployment of limited fuel sources, later work focused on tyre management, and three-dimensional track modelling. In 2021, he focused on modifying his Formula One work for use on highly banked NASCAR ovals. Some of his vehicle dynamics work is included in the textbook Dynamics and Optimal Control of Road Vehicles.

== Awards and honors ==
- 1992 – Elected Fellow, Institute of Electrical and Electronics Engineers
- 1994 – Elected Fellow, Institute of Electrical Engineers
- 1997 – Elected Fellow, Royal Academy of Engineering
- 2002 – Elected Fellow, City and Guilds of London Institute
- 2018 – Life Fellow, Institute of Electrical and Electronics Engineers
- 2019 – Fellow, South African Academy of Engineering
- 2019 – Honeywell International medal, Institute of Measurement and Control
- 2022 – A1 Rating, The NRF (South Africa)

== Bibliography ==
=== Selected Books ===
- Limebeer, David (1994). Linear Robust Control-Solutions. Prentice Hall. ISBN 0131335472.
- Limebeer, David (2012). Linear Robust Control. Courier Corporation. ISBN 978-0486488363.
- Limebeer, David (2018). Dynamics and Optimal Control of Road Vehicles. ISBN 978-0198825715.

=== Selected articles ===
- Safonov, M. G.; Limebeer, D. J. N.; Chiang, R. Y. (1989). "Simplifying the H∞ theory via loop-shifting, matrix-pencil and descriptor concepts". International Journal of Control. 50 (6): 2467–2488. doi:10.1080/00207178908953510.
- Glover, K.; Limebeer, D. J. N.; Doyle, J.; Kasenally, E. M.; Safonov, M. G. (1991). "A characterization of all solutions to the four-block general distance problem". SIAM Journal on Control and Optimization. 29 (2): 283–324. doi:10.1137/0329016.
- Limebeer, D. J.; Kasenally, E. M.; Perkins, J. D. (1993). "On the design of robust two degree of freedom controllers". Automatica. 29 (1): 157–168. doi:10.1016/0005-1098(93)90179-W.
- Limebeer, D. J.; Sharp, R. S.; Evangelou, S. (2001). "The stability of motorcycles under acceleration and braking". Proceedings of the Institution of Mechanical Engineers, Part C: Journal of Mechanical Engineering Science. 215 (9): 1095–1109. doi:10.1177/095440620121500910. hdl:10044/1/1149. S2CID 58895613.
- Sharp, R. S.; Evangelou, S.; Limebeer, D. J. (2004). "Advances in the modelling of motorcycle dynamics". Multibody System Dynamics. 12 (3): 251–283. doi:10.1023/B:MUBO.0000049195.60868.a2. hdl:10044/1/4326. S2CID 3243509.
- Limebeer, D. J.; Sharp, R. S. (2006). "Bicycles, motorcycles, and models". IEEE Control Systems Magazine. 26 (5): 34–61. Bibcode:2006ICSys..26e..34L. doi:10.1109/MCS.2006.1700044. hdl:10044/1/1112. S2CID 11394895.
- Massaro, M.; Limebeer, D. J. N. (2021). "Minimum-lap-time optimisation and simulation". Vehicle System Dynamics. 59 (7): 1069–1113. Bibcode:2021VSD....59.1069M. doi:10.1080/00423114.2021.1910718. hdl:11577/3389257.
- Lovato, S.; Massaro, M.; Limebeer, D. J. N. (2021). "Curved-ribbon-based track modelling for minimum lap-time optimisation". Meccanica. 56 (8): 2139–2152. doi:10.1007/s11012-021-01387-3. hdl:11577/3392930.
- Limebeer, D. J. N.; Bastin, M.; Warren, E.; Fensham, H. G. (2023). "Optimal control of a NASCAR–specification race car". Vehicle System Dynamics. 61 (5): 1210–1235. Bibcode:2023VSD....61.1210L. doi:10.1080/00423114.2022.2067573.
