= Canada Safety Council =

- Type: National, non-profit, charitable organization dedicated to safety.
- Legal status: Active
- Purpose: Advocacy, education and collaboration for public safety.
- Headquarters: Ottawa, Ontario, Canada
- Region served: Canada
- Official language: English, French
- President: Gareth Jones
- Staff: 10 (2019)
- Website: canadasafetycouncil.org

The Canada Safety Council is a national, non-profit, charitable organization dedicated to safety. It works to prevent deaths and injuries by promoting education and awareness across Canada. Its mascot is Elmer the Safety Elephant.

It provides marketing opportunities for its sponsors.

During the COVID-19 pandemic, CSC received a $220,000 grant from the Public Health Agency of Canada's Immunization Partnership Fund for a project titled the “Elmer Vaccine Education and Awareness Program”. The resulting program, centred around a character named Elmer the Safety Elephant, was “delivered in schools with the support of teachers across Canada” to increase uptake of COVID-19 vaccines. It was endorsed by the Canadian Association of School System Administrators (CASSA), Canadian School Boards Association (CSBA) and Physical and Health Education Canada.
