= Shinosaur =

Street-art object in Moscow

- Шинозавр
- Interactive map of Shinosaur
- Location: Moscow
- Coordinates: 55.7742°N 37.4949°E
- Designer: unknown
- Type: Street-art
- Material: pipes, tyres
- Beginning date: 1971? 1987?

Shinosaur (Russian: Шинозавр (lit. Tyre-saur), officially: "art construction "Dragon"") was an art object of Moscow "housing and public utilities art" (ZhEK art, ЖЭК-арт), created in 1971 (according to other sources, in 1987) and removed in 2022, despite the protests of residents and promises of the authorities to preserve the object.

== History ==
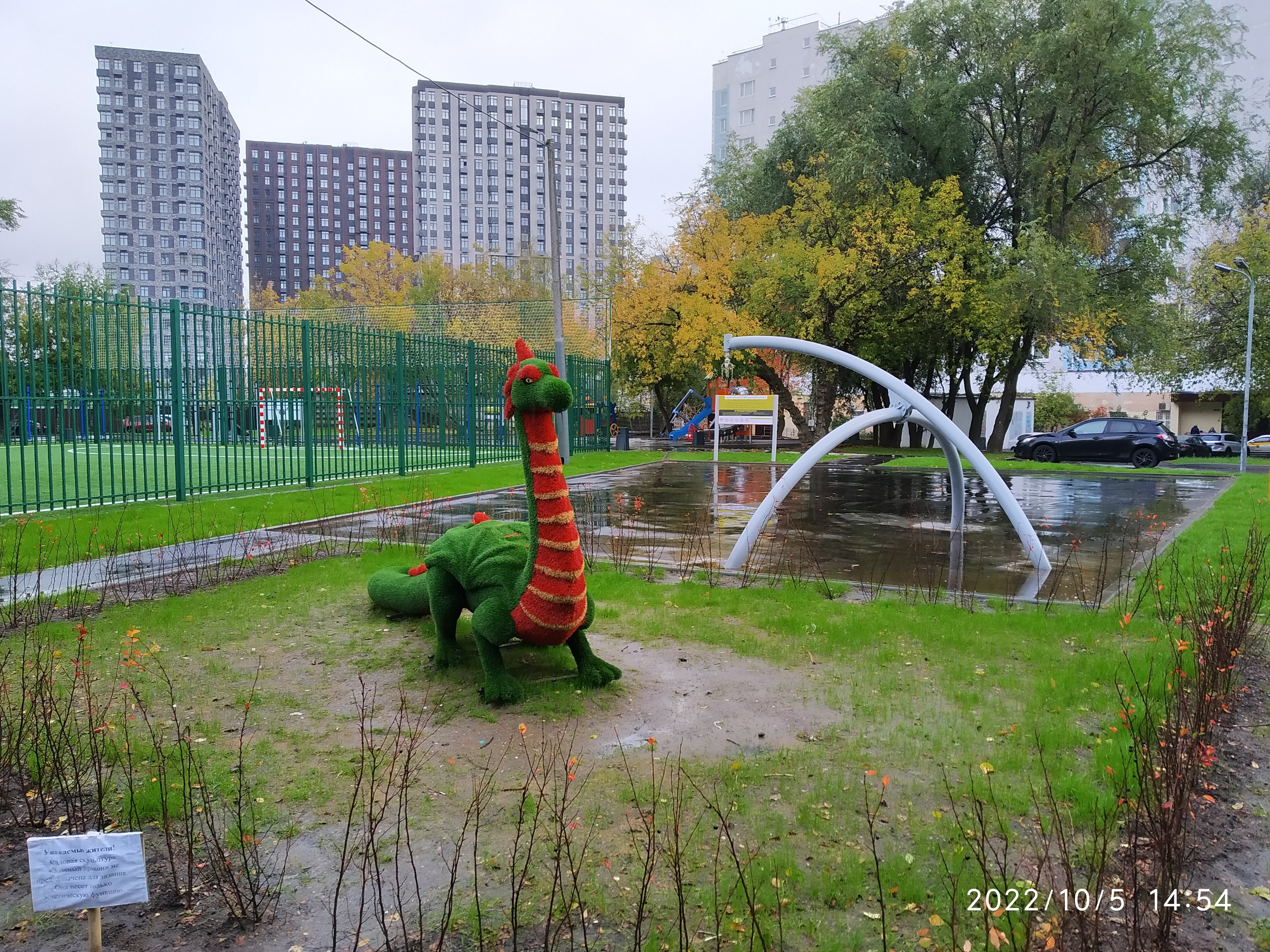
Shinosaur was replaced with the "Green Dragon".

According to the oral reports of the authorities, the Shinosaur existed at this place since 1971, local residents in their memories indicate 1987 or the beginning of the 1990s. According to the same recollections, the Shinosaur was created by car enthusiasts from neighboring garages, and the material (tires) was most likely brought from the First Automobile Plant named after G. L. Krause, which is located on the opposite side of Mnyovniki.

For the past 30 years, the Shinosaur has been a local favorite, climbed (and fell) by children.

In the spring of 2022, plans for the improvement of the courtyard between buildings 10-1 and 10-4 along Mnyovniki Street appeared. The head of the Council assured the worried residents that the Shinosaur would not be touched.

However, on July 6, 2022, Shinosaur was demolished.

== Description ==
The basis of the structure is a steel pipe, bent at an angle to the horizon and tightly welded with several shorter pipes that act as a holding cross ("paw"). At the highest point, a corner is welded to the pipe across it, after which the pipe bends down in an arc, ending with a rubber tongue. Throughout the pipes, automobile tires of various diameters, from cars to tractors, are strung on them. Since the mid-2000s, tires have been painted in bright colors (first purple with red, then blue with yellow and red). Prior to this, the monument was black. In general, the structure vaguely resembled the Loch Ness Monster.

== Influence ==
The popularity of the Shinosaur was so high that the locals filled themselves with tattoos with his image.

== Sources ==
- Названы исчезнувшие с улиц столицы объекты ЖКХ-арта, Moslenta
- ezhick.online/2022/07/07/11917/net-bolshe-shinozavra/ Нет больше шинозавра
- Шинозавр: конец эпохи
- Ушла эпоха: гигантского шинозавра снесли
- Новостной репортаж на НТВ
- Чтобы было красиво // Meduza.io, 2021
