= Hexamethoxymethylmelamine =

Names
- Systematic IUPAC name N2,N2,N4,N4,N6,N6-Hexakis(methoxymethyl)-1,3,5-triazine-2,4,6-triamine
- Other names Hexamethylolemelamine; Hexakis(methoxymethyl)melamine

Identifiers
CAS Number	3089-11-0
3D model (JSmol)	Interactive image
ChEMBL	ChEMBL3183742
ChemSpider	56259
ECHA InfoCard	100.019.475
EC Number	221-422-3
PubChem CID	62479
UNII	890DZ25729
CompTox Dashboard (EPA)	DTXSID001037068 DTXSID9027520, DTXSID001037068
- InChI: InChI=1S/C15H30N6O6/c1-22-7-19(8-23-2)13-16-14(20(9-24-3)10-25-4)18-15(17-13)21(11-26-5)12-27-6/h7-12H2,1-6H3 Key: BNCADMBVWNPPIZ-UHFFFAOYSA-N
- SMILES: COCN(COC)C1=NC(=NC(=N1)N(COC)COC)N(COC)COC

Properties
Chemical formula	C_{15}H_{30}N_{6}O_{6}
Molar mass	390.441 g·mol^{−1}
Melting point	40–42 °C (104–108 °F; 313–315 K)

Hazards
- GHS labelling
Pictograms	(GHS07: Exclamation mark) (GHS08: Health hazard)
Signal word	Danger
Hazard statements	H317, H319, H341, H351
Precautionary statements	P264, P280, P305+P351+P338, P337+P313
- Except where otherwise noted, data are given for materials in their standard state (at 25 °C [77 °F], 100 kPa). Infobox references

Hexa(methoxymethyl)melamine (HMMM) is a hemiaminal ether widely employed as a crosslinking agent and adhesion-promoting additive in the manufacture of coatings and rubber products. It is produced via the reaction of melamine with formaldehyde and excess methanol, with the latter also acting as the reaction solvent. It can be considered as a monomeric intermediate in the formation of melamine resin.

In rubber compounding, HMMM is commonly used in conjunction with resorcinol and hydrated silica in a system known as HRH (Hexamethoxymethylmelamine-Resorcinol-Hydrated silica). This system improves adhesion between rubber and reinforcing materials, such as nylon or steel cords, thereby improving mechanical performance and durability. It is used in various high-performance rubber goods, including high-pressure hoses, conveyor belts, and particularly automotive tyres.

Due to its moderate water solubility, it slowly leaches out of the rubber over time. This release is especially significant in tyre-wear particles generated during normal vehicle operation. Road runoff then introduces it into urban waters, where it has become a contaminant of emerging concern.

== See also ==
- Rubber pollution
