= Wheelbase =

Distance between the centers of the front and rear wheels

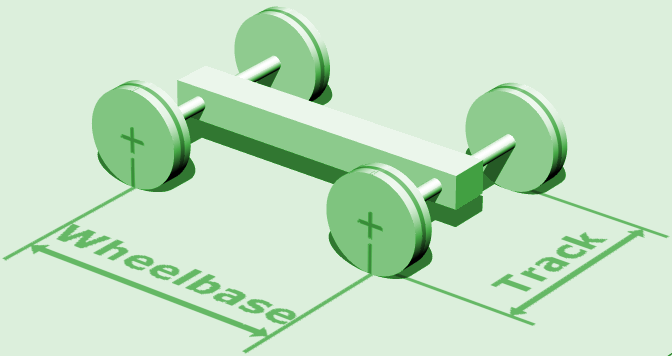
Wheelbase (measured between rotational center hubs of wheels)

Bike geometry parameters: The wheelbase of a bicycle

In both road and rail vehicles, the wheelbase is the horizontal distance between the centers of the front and rear wheels. For road vehicles with more than two axles (for example, some trucks and buses), the wheelbase is the distance between the steering (front) axle and the centerpoint of the driving axle group. In the case of a tri-axle truck or bus, the wheelbase would be the distance between the steering axle and a point midway between the two rear axles.

== Vehicles ==
The wheelbase of a vehicle equals the distance between its front and rear wheels. At equilibrium, the total torque of the forces acting on a vehicle is zero. Therefore, the wheelbase is related to the force on each pair of tires by the following formula:

$$F_f = {d_r \over L}mg$$

$$F_r = {d_f \over L}mg$$

where $F_f$ is the force on the front tires, $F_r$ is the force on the rear tires, $L$ is the wheelbase, $d_r$ is the distance from the center of mass (CM) to the rear wheels, $d_f$ is the distance from the center of mass to the front wheels ($d_f$ + $d_r$ = $L$), $m$ is the mass of the vehicle, and $g$ is the gravity constant. So, for example, when a truck is loaded, its center of gravity shifts rearward and the force on the rear tires increases. The vehicle will then ride lower. The amount the vehicle sinks will depend on counter acting forces, like the size of the tires, tire pressure, and the spring rate of the suspension. If the vehicle is accelerating or decelerating, extra torque is placed on the rear or front tire respectively. The equation relating the wheelbase, height above the ground of the CM, and the force on each pair of tires becomes:

$$F_f = {d_r \over L}mg - {h_{cm} \over L}ma$$

$$F_r = {d_f \over L}mg + {h_{cm} \over L}ma$$

where $F_f$ is the force on the front tires, $F_r$ is the force on the rear tires, $d_r$ is the distance from the CM to the rear wheels, $d_f$ is the distance from the CM to the front wheels, $L$ is the wheelbase, $m$ is the mass of the vehicle, $g$ is the acceleration of gravity (approx. 9.8 m/s^{2}), $h_{cm}$ is the height of the CM above the ground, $a$ is the acceleration (or deceleration if the value is negative). So, as is common experience, when the vehicle accelerates, the rear usually sinks and the front rises depending on the suspension. Likewise, when braking the front noses down and the rear rises.

Because of the effect the wheelbase has on the weight distribution of the vehicle, wheelbase dimensions are crucial to the balance and steering. For example, a car with a much greater weight load on the rear tends to understeer due to the lack of the load (force) on the front tires and therefore the grip (friction) from them. This is why it is crucial, when towing a single-axle caravan, to distribute the caravan's weight so that down-thrust on the tow-hook is about 100 pounds force (400 N). Likewise, a car may oversteer or even "spin out" if there is too much force on the front tires and not enough on the rear tires. Also, when turning there is lateral torque placed upon the tires which imparts a turning force that depends upon the length of the tire distances from the CM. Thus, in a car with a short wheelbase ("SWB"), the short lever arm from the CM to the rear wheel will result in a greater lateral force on the rear tire which means greater acceleration and less time for the driver to adjust and prevent a spin out or worse.

Wheelbases provide the basis for one of the most common vehicle size class systems.

=== Varying wheelbases within nameplate ===
Some vehicles are offered with long-wheelbase variants to increase the spaciousness and therefore the luxury of the vehicle. This practice can often be found on full-size cars like the Mercedes-Benz S-Class, but ultra-luxury vehicles such as the Rolls-Royce Phantom and even large family cars like the Rover 75 came with 'limousine' versions. Prime Minister of the United Kingdom Tony Blair was given a long-wheelbase version of the Rover 75 for official use. and even some SUVs like the VW Tiguan and Jeep Wrangler are available with long wheelbases.

In contrast, coupé varieties of some vehicles such as the Honda Accord are usually built on shorter wheelbases than the sedans they are derived from.

=== Bikes ===
The wheelbase on many commercially available bicycles and motorcycles is so short, relative to the height of their centers of mass, that they are able to perform stoppies and wheelies.

=== Skateboards ===
In skateboarding the word 'wheelbase' is used for the distance between the two inner pairs of mounting holes on the deck. This is different from the distance between the rotational centers of the two wheel pairs. A reason for this alternative use is that decks are sold with prefabricated holes, but usually without trucks and wheels. It is therefore easier to use the prefabricated holes for measuring and describing this characteristic of the deck.

A common misconception is that the choice of wheelbase is influenced by the height of the skateboarder. However, the length of the deck would then be a better candidate, because the wheelbase affects characteristics useful in different speeds or terrains regardless of the height of the skateboarder. For example, a deck with a long wheelbase, say 22 inches (55.9 cm), will respond slowly to turns, which is often desirable in high speeds. A deck with a short wheelbase, say 14 inches (35.6 cm), will respond quickly to turns, which is often desirable when skating backyard pools or other terrains requiring quick or intense turns.

== Rail ==
In railway vehicles, the wheelbase follows a similar concept. However, because the wheels may be of different sizes (for example, on a steam locomotive), the measurement is taken between the points where the wheels touch the top of the rail, rather than between the center hubs of the wheels.

On vehicles where the wheelsets (axles) are mounted inside the vehicle frame (mostly in steam locomotives), the wheelbase is the distance between the front-most and rear-most wheelsets.

On vehicles where the wheelsets are mounted on bogies (American: trucks), three wheelbase measurements can be distinguished:

- the distance between the pivot points of the front-most and rear-most bogie;
- the distance between the front-most and rear-most wheelsets of the vehicle;
- the distance between the front-most and rear-most wheelsets of each bogie.

The wheelbase affects the rail vehicle's capability to negotiate curves. Short-wheelbased vehicles can negotiate sharper curves. On some larger wheelbase locomotives, inner wheels may lack flanges in order to pass curves.

The wheelbase also affects the load the vehicle poses to the track, track infrastructure and bridges. All other conditions being equal, a shorter wheelbase vehicle represents a more concentrated load to the track than a longer wheelbase vehicle. As railway lines are designed to take a predetermined maximum load per unit of length (tonnes per meter, or pounds per foot), the rail vehicles' wheelbase is designed according to their intended gross weight. The higher the gross weight, the longer the wheelbase must be.

== See also ==
- Axle track
- Bicycle and motorcycle geometry
- Force
- Overhang (vehicles)
- Static equilibrium
- Weight
- Wheel gauge
- Wheelset
