= Ghost Rider (motorcyclist) =

Motorcycle stunt rider

"Ghost Rider" is the alias used by a Swedish motorcycle stunt rider, called "probably the most famous flaunter of road rules the world has ever seen", whose internet videos have achieved a "cult following" with millions of views.

== Biography ==
Ghost Rider performs in a series of independently produced DVD films where the recurring theme involves him performing illegal maneuvers on his motorcycle on public roads across Sweden and other countries in Europe. The films show Ghost Rider, mostly in the perspective of cameras mounted on his motorbike, riding at extreme speeds on busy roads, provoking law enforcement officers into high-speed chases and performing various stunts. Ghost Rider usually wears black leathers and a black helmet with black visor to help conceal his identity.

Motorbikes used in the films are the Suzuki GSX-R1000, Suzuki GSX-1300R (Hayabusa) and Kawasaki Ninja. He has used a variety of different year models with differing modifications to each, including a carbon fibre GSX-R1000 K4 in Ghost Rider Goes Crazy in Europe and a 280+ brake horsepower turbocharged GSX-R1000 K5 in Ghost Rider Goes Undercover.

=== Identity ===
Ghost Rider has been identified by various media as being, or as possibly being, Swedish ex-racer and mechanic Patrik Fürstenhoff. Fürstenhoff is listed at Guinness World Records as holding the record for the first documented 220 mph (354 km/h) wheelie on a 500 hp (370 kW) turbocharged Suzuki Hayabusa, and an earlier wheelie record.

== Notable feats ==
- In Ghost Rider: The Final Ride, Ghost Rider does a timed run in Sweden from Stockholm to Uppsala (dubbed Uppsala Run, a distance of 68 km or 42.6 miles) in 14m 55s with an average speed of 273.1 km/h (170.1 mph) in heavy traffic. He breaks his own record in Uppsala Run 2 (Ghost Rider Goes Crazy in Europe) with a faster bike by a mere two seconds (14m 53s) with even heavier traffic present.
- In Ghost Rider Goes Crazy in Europe, Ghost Rider does a timed run in Paris, France on the Paris Peripherique (French term for ring road/beltway) and completes the circuit with an elapsed time of 9m 57s. This was done as a tribute to a French street racer going by the alias "Le Prince Noir" (The Black Prince) who completed the circuit on his motorcycle in 11m 04s in 1989.
- Also in Ghost Rider Goes Crazy in Europe, Ghost Rider does a timed run in the Netherlands from Rotterdam to Amsterdam (a distance of approximately 70 kilometers) in 20m 32s.

== Vehicles ==
Each movie has a scene where Ghost Rider rides a highly tuned, turbocharged Suzuki Hayabusa. The Hayabusa in Ghost Rider: The Final Ride was tuned to 417 bhp (311 kW), and the one used for the later movies was at 499 bhp (372 kW). Although Ghost Rider's primary vehicle is a motorcycle, he uses a wide variety of other vehicles in the movies including different types of cars, bicycles, minibikes and even a snowmobile on public streets.

== Filmography ==
To date, a total of six Ghost Rider titles have been released. The fifth, titled Ghost Rider: Back to Basics was originally due to be released in December 2006. However, due to unforeseen circumstances, the film was not released until 15 February 2008. The latest, Ghost Rider 6.66: What the F**k, was released in 2011.

Title	Year
Ghost Rider: The Final Ride	2002
Ghost Rider Goes Wild	2003
Ghost Rider Goes Crazy in Europe	2004
Ghost Rider Goes Undercover	2005
Ghost Rider: Back to Basics	2008
Ghost Rider 6.66: What the F**k	2011

== See also ==
- Motorcycle hooliganism
- Getaway in Stockholm
