= David McKenna =

David McKenna may refer to:

- David McKenna (footballer) (born 1986), Scottish footballer
- David McKenna (writer) (born 1968), American screenwriter and producer
- David McKenna (politician) (?–2014), Canadian optometrist, businessman and politician
- Dave McKenna (1930–2008), jazz pianist
- Dave McKenna (stunt rider) (born 1987), Australian street bike stunt performer
