= Dave McKenna (stunt rider) =

Professional Athlete, Street Bike Freestyle Stunt Rider

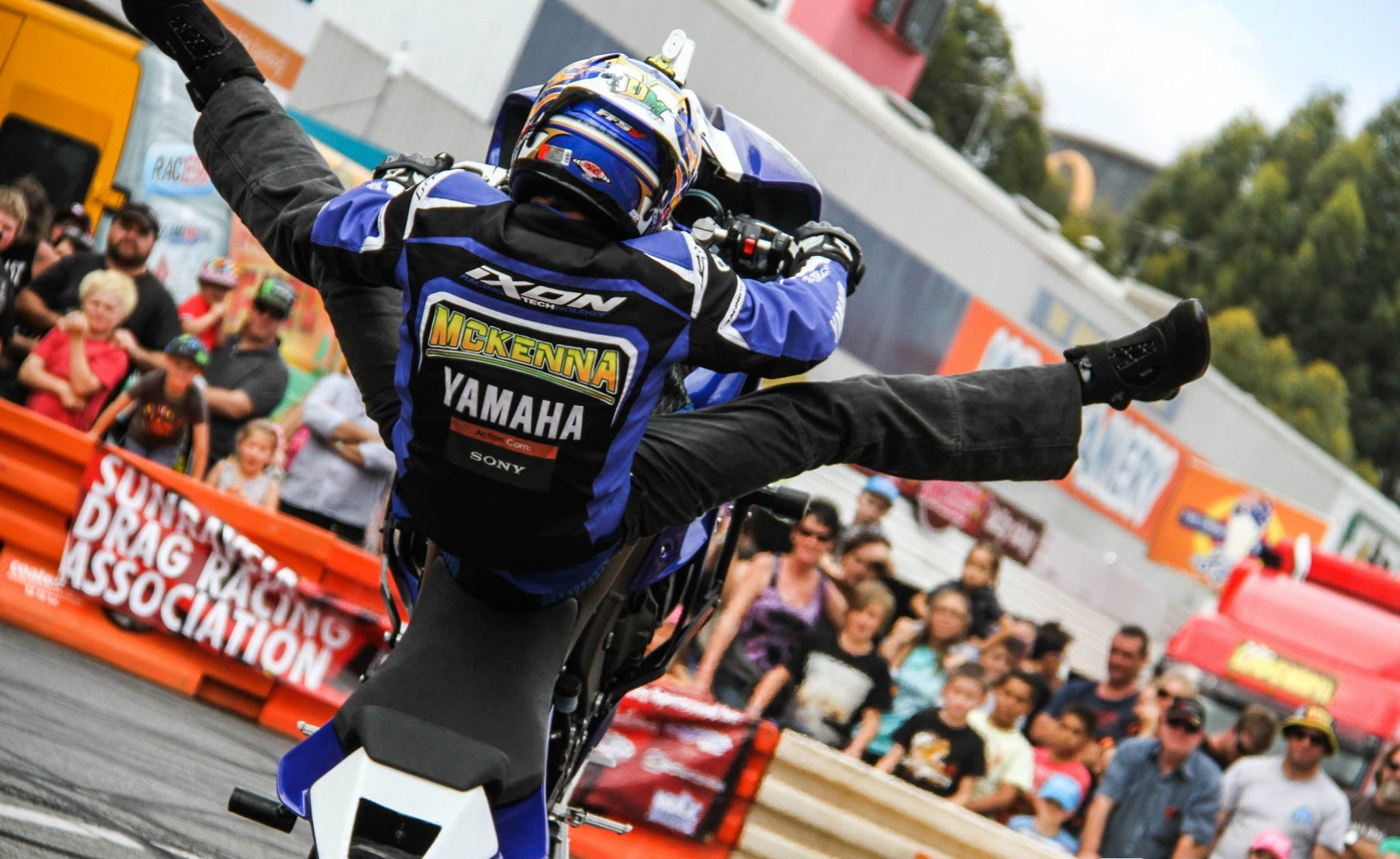
- Born: 8 September 1987 (age 38)
- Occupation: Stunt performer

Dave McKenna (born 8 September 1987) is an Australian street bike stunt performer from Ballarat, Victoria.

== Biography ==
=== Career ===
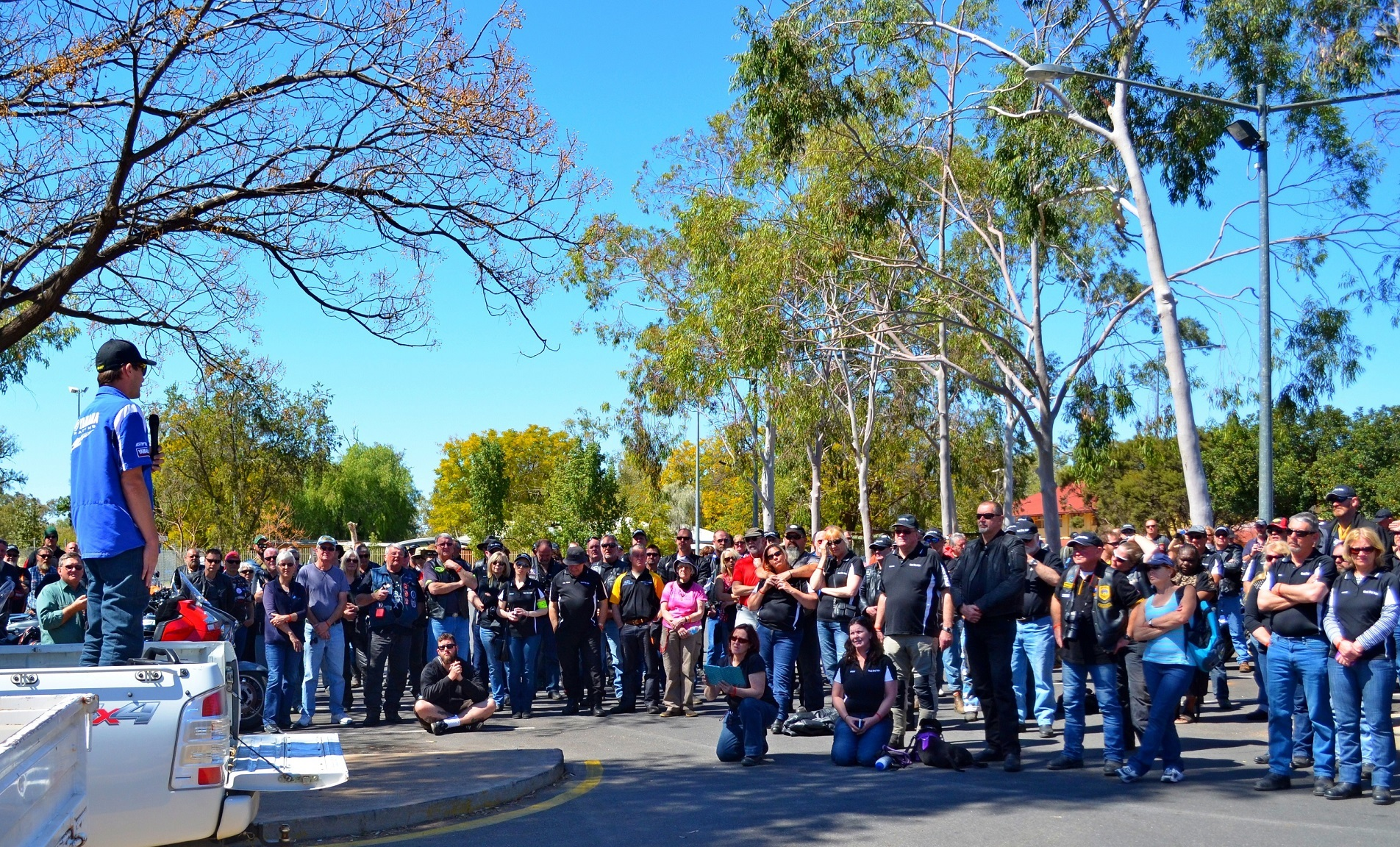
McKenna speaking at the Black Dog Ride 2013 in Alice Springs.

Mckenna started his career at the age of 20, having watched street bike stunt riding in his teens, he took up the sport in 2007. In 2013 he was the first Australian stunt performer to be signed by Yamaha Motor. The official partnership then launched the new Yamaha MT-09 in the Australian market with a full length TVC and custom stunt modified MT-09's. Resident in Sydney, McKenna has performed at events such as the A1 Grand Prix, China Super bikes Championship, V8 Supercars, Moto GP, Nitro Championships, the Australian Tattoo and Body Expo, Ballarat Swap Meet, and York Motorcycle Festival.

=== Charities ===
Having beaten cancer twice at a young age McKenna supports charities by participating in awareness raising performances for organisations such as Make a Wish Foundation; Cancer Council Australia; the Sony Foundation and the Black Dog Ride.

=== Sponsors ===
Yamaha Motor Australia, Shark Helmets, Ixon apparel, Yamalube, Yamaha Motorcycle Insurance

== See also ==
- Stunt performer
- Motorcycle stunt riding
- Bicycle and motorcycle dynamics
- Wheelie
- Stoppie
- Weight transfer
