= Dale Buggins =

Australian stunt performer

Dale Charles Buggins (1961–1981) was an Australian stunt motorcyclist who has built a national and international reputation by the age of 20. At 17, Buggins broke a world record previously held by American stuntman Evel Knievel when he jumped 25 cars with a Yamaha dirt bike, in 1978.

== Early life ==
Buggins was born to parents Jan and Ken in Carmarthen, Wales, and immigrated to Australia with his family at the age of 7 months. His interest in motorcycles began at the age of nine, when his father gave him a small motorbike powered by a lawnmower engine. In just a few years he was riding an XR75 Honda and doing jumps off car bonnets like the others at the local dirt bike track, known as the "Dude Ranch" near Umina on the Central Coast of NSW. A schoolfriend recalls:

Any given afternoon when school had finished, and on weekends there would be all kids blasting around kicking dirt up. Buggo to us, or Dale would be going hard, wheelies, jumps, big power slides, it was something to see. Dale was a school friend of mine at Woy Woy South Primary School, and Woy Woy High where he did very well in all subjects. I have pictures of Dale in our Rugby team. In 1976 he moved with his family to Wyong where he honed his jumping skills on a farm jumping cars. Dale became a sensation with his stunt shows, the rest is history.

== Career ==
Buggins's work pre-dated Freestyle Motocross and the Crusty Demons by 10-plus years. In that sense, at least in Australia, he was a stunt motorbike pioneer like his idol, Evel Knievel.

On 28 May 1978 Buggins broke Knievel's world record by jumping over 25 cars at the Newcastle Motordome and by 1979 he was touring Australia with the "Evel Knievel Spectacular", a Michel Edgley Production. Scheduled to play 35 cities and towns, the tour flopped after four, when Knievel left the show citing safety concerns.(The Canberra Times, 2 March, 1979, p.3). The last venue was Melbourne Show Grounds. In 1980 he visited Seattle in the United States to perform with American stunt motorcyclist Gary Wells.

Jumping everything from cars to buses, Buggins also created a unique motorcycle high wire act with his sister Chantel. He toured the "Dale Buggins Spectacular", in the States and Australia, appearing at the Sydney Royal Easter Show and others around the country. A documentary made with Buggins, Mud Sweat and Gears, by Douglas Stanley and Nomad Films was never released in Australia but can be found on YouTube.

Buggins's record has since been broken by fellow Australian FMX stunt rider Robbie Maddison.

== Death and memorial ==
Buggins died by suicide on 18 September 1981 in the Marco Polo Hotel in Melbourne, by shooting himself in the chest with a rifle that he purchased the previous day. Buggins had just returned from touring the U.S. with his sister Chantell, and was in Melbourne for the Royal Melbourne Show where he was scheduled to appear.

His father and younger sisters, Chantell (who subsequently quit showbusiness) and Emma, appeared in the Channel 9 special in 1997.

The National Motorcycle Museum in Nabiac in NSW, Australia, has a section of wall devoted to images and memorabilia of Dale Buggins's career. Another museum, The Stuntman and Daredevil Hall of Fame, which will include Dale Buggins memorabilia is planned for Junee. A tribute, "Song For Dale", was recorded by Melbourne band Lost Ragas on Transatlantic Highway LP.

An official fan club, supported by the Buggins family, can be found on Facebook.

On the weekend of September 17, 2021, a memorial service was held at the Palmdale Cemetery, NSW, hosted by the fan club, and attended by family, friends and fans. A road trip to the Nabiac Motorcycle Museum followed where an auction of Dale's memorabilia was held to raise funds for the mental health charity, Gotcha for Life. Videos of the event can be found on youtube.

== Bibliography ==
The only book to exist so far is a biography, Defying Gravity, The Dale Buggins Story (by Damian Kringas, Independence Jones 2009). For more background, Ian B. Jamieson's Bring on the Stuntman! gives a detailed account of the "Evel Knievel Thrill Spectacular", which Buggins was part of.

== Video and film ==
A number of short videos recording his development and stunts, including snatches of Dale Buggins himself, include:

- Dale Buggins retrospective video on the ABC TV J File program
- Douglas Stanley's unreleased documentary, Mud, Sweat and Gears, produced by Nomad Films, about Dale Buggins work and life.
- A Moment of Truth, Dale Buggins tribute with Jennifer Keyte, Channel 9 Television, 1997
- Dale Buggins Fan Club Memorial event videos

== See also ==
- Robbie Maddison
- Evel Knievel
- Motorcycle stunt riding
