= Hollywood Stuntz gang assault =

Road incident in New York City, United States

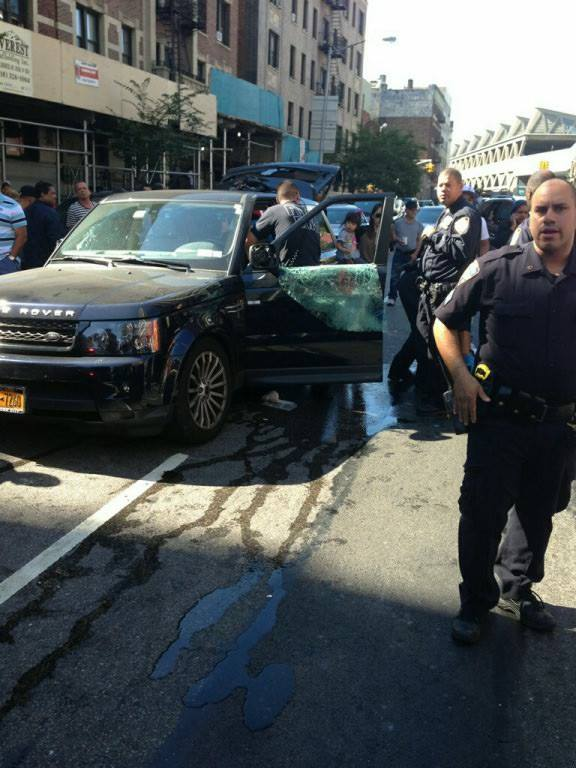
Aftermath showing broken window of Lien's Range Rover

On September 29, 2013, motorist Alexian Lien was assaulted while driving on the Henry Hudson Parkway in New York City. Lien had gotten into an altercation earlier in the day with motorcyclists who were participating in a rally called Hollywood's Block Party. One of the bikers pulled in front of Lien and slowed dramatically. Lien said that he struck the bike from behind, stopped his vehicle, and was quickly surrounded by bikers, who began attacking his SUV. He testified that he feared for his life. Lien accelerated, driving his SUV over Edwin Mieses, paralyzing him, and also running over several motorcycles. Lien then fled the scene in his SUV. A chase ensued, which ended in Lien being pulled from his vehicle and beaten. The media later reported that the involved bikers were members of a loose association of high-performance motorcycle enthusiasts known as "Hollywood Stuntz" who had previously been observed and filmed engaging in reckless driving and threatening motorists.

Among the bikers was an off-duty New York City Police Department officer. The attack was caught on video and garnered international attention. Eleven bikers were convicted of assault and other criminal charges relating to the attack, and legislation has been proposed to regulate motorcycle rallies in New York City.

== Incident ==
=== Rally ===
On September 29, 2013, a group of motorcyclists were participating in an annual rally, titled "Hollywood Stuntz," organized by a man named Jamie Lao. Rallies organized by Lao in the past involved performing motorcycle stunts and an unauthorized ride through Times Square, Manhattan. During the 2012 ride a year prior, "well over a thousand motorcycles, dirt bikes, quads, four-wheel vehicles" rode through Times Square, according to New York Police Commissioner Raymond Kelly. The group did not have permits to do so. Driving through the section of Broadway within Times Square has been illegal since it was pedestrianized in 2009. Kelly reported that the altercation with Lien was not the only problem involving the group on September 29, as over 200 other people had complained to the police about the reckless driving of the bikers on Manhattan's streets that day.

=== Altercation ===
The altercation began when a sport utility vehicle (SUV) driven by motorist Alexian Lien encountered a group of motorcyclists in Lower Manhattan. Lien, a then-33-year-old Chinese American banker, was heading to New Jersey with his wife, Rosalyn Ng and two-year-old daughter, who were also in the vehicle; they were going to celebrate the couple's anniversary. According to Lien, he dialed 911 after he saw several motorcycles run a red light and nearly hit a woman carrying a baby, but reached a New Jersey operator. He said the bikers were "popping wheelies" and slapping the tops of cars as they drove past and one motorcyclist was maneuvering to block other vehicles to allow the bikes to pass. Lien said he was "annoyed" and kept driving past. Following the incident, authorities familiar with motorcycle groups around New York stated that it was a common practice for these groups to "take over the entire highway for the purpose of slowing it down to allow [other bikers] to race in front of them" to perform tricks and be free of other traffic. His wife tossed a half-eaten plum and a water bottle at the bikers. According to Lien, one biker responded by punching the driver's side mirror, shattering it while another was "waiving [sic] for other motorcyclists to come toward us, he was yelling at us and he was threatening us. He was screaming profanities at us, and he was also making slitting-throat gestures."

Shortly after, on the Henry Hudson Parkway in Upper Manhattan, motorcyclist Christopher Cruz merged in front of Lien and applied his brakes, quickly slowing down before being involved in light bumper contact with Lien's Range Rover. Cruz reportedly sustained minor injuries after being struck by the SUV. Lien and many of the motorcyclists stopped their vehicles. The video shows many of the bikers gathering around the Range Rover driven by Lien. "And as they're around my car, I feel it being hit, being kicked", he said. Lien accelerated to escape, reportedly driving over three motorcycles and a rider, named Edwin Mieses, who had dismounted and was in front of the Range Rover. "I'm horrified at this point, and I recall asking my wife, 'What do I do? What do I do?' She says, 'Just go! Just go! And I make a hard right because I see there's an opening and I ... I just go." Lien said. Mieses was severely injured, suffering a fractured spine and punctured lung. Mieses later stated that he was checking on Cruz after his collision with the Range Rover and was walking back to his bike when he was hit.

Enraged at Lien for running over Mieses, the furious bikers chased Lien for several miles. Lien's wife called 911 four times in an eight-minute time span during the drive. A few minutes later, the video shows Lien stopping for a red light and a biker is seen running up and opening the driver's side door before Lien accelerates again to escape. Several minutes later, the SUV came to a halt behind other vehicles at a red light. One of the bikers then dismounted his motorcycle and struck the driver's window of the Range Rover with his helmet, shattering it. Lien was then dragged from the vehicle and assaulted. Another uploaded video shows Lien lying on the ground with bikers stomping on him and beating him with their helmets. Consuegra told police that one biker, later alleged by prosecutors to be Robert Sims, also attempted to pull Lien's wife from the vehicle and allegedly said "you're going to get it, too". Ng said the man was unable to pull her out because she had her seat belt on. After the biker retreated, she managed to get the passenger door shut and climbed into the backseat to check on their daughter, who was covered in broken glass, but otherwise unharmed.

Lien sustained lacerations to his face and sides, requiring stitches at a local hospital. Photos of the SUV after the incident show extensive damage. The driver side, passenger side, and rear windows are smashed. One tire is completely flat, and a second one is missing entirely.

== Reaction ==
=== Viral video ===
A video of the incident quickly went viral after it was uploaded by a biker to Live Leak with the caption, "A black Range Rover ran over a group of bikers in New York City during an annual street ride." The incident was covered widely by national news networks. Following the publicity for the video shot on September 29, other videos surfaced of the group on other rides. One video, shot in 2011, shows riders driving recklessly, weaving in and out of traffic, driving on sidewalks, running red lights and surrounding and threatening the driver of a Prius. The bikers beat on the window of his car, but the driver was unharmed.

=== NYPD ===
The NYPD faced criticism when some of the bikers involved in the chase and attack were identified as off-duty New York City police officers. Ten-year veteran and undercover detective Wojciech Braszczok surrendered to authorities and was arrested on October 8. An undercover narcotics detective has been identified by the press as being present but not participating in the assault. Sources reported a total of five off-duty officers were originally present on the West Side Highway, and that at least two saw the assault.

=== "Biker gang" ===
Following the altercation, there was much discussion regarding whether this group of riders was a "biker gang". It was commonly referred to as a biker gang, more specifically, "Hollywood Stuntz gang" in the news. However, Jamie Lao, who organized the rally, asserts that the title "Hollywood Stuntz" does not apply to the riders, but is a moniker he goes by himself. He denies being present for the incident. Many have pointed out a distinction between this group of riders and what people typically think of as a motorcycle gang. A report on the topic by the California Department of Justice stated that "outlaw motorcycle gangs are sophisticated organizations who utilize their affiliation with a motorcycle club as a conduit for criminal activity. The nature of their activity is generally conspiratorial, and their goals are attained through use of violence and intimidation." While many of the bikers were found to have criminal histories and it appeared there were aspects of intimidation in the incident on September 29 as well as on the 2011 video, many pointed out that the bikers who gathered on that day do not have any affiliation with each other aside from participating in the ride. Former New York police chief and future police commissioner William Bratton said these groups are popping up nationally. They are typically organized online and congregate with the intention of performing high speed stunts en masse. Bratton explained that traditional motorcycle gangs are typically white, rooted in a specific neighborhood, and often are involved in drug dealing. These new groups are racially diverse, younger, loosely affiliated, and do not use the group for the purposes of furthering criminal enterprises.

=== Edwin Mieses ===
Lawyer Gloria Allred was hired to represent the critically injured Mieses by members of his family, while the law firm of Massimo & Panetta, P.C., represents the Lien family. Allred claims Mieses was the victim in the incident. "He did nothing wrong...all he had done was get off his bike, go over and try to calm everybody down", she said. She reasoned that Lien could have honked his horn or told the bikers to get out of the way to give them a chance to part. Several months after the accident, Mieses reported that physicians have given him a less than 1% chance of walking again. He stated that he was not threatening Lien when he was hit, but was instead checking on Cruz after his accident and does not blame Lien for his injuries.

At the time of the incident, Edwin Mieses was driving on a revoked license. His Massachusetts drivers license was revoked until 2017. He was previously arrested in May 2013 for driving on a revoked license.

== Legal action ==
A total of 15 people were arrested, 55 motorcycles were confiscated, and 69 summonses were issued in connection with the September 29 event. Eleven bikers were convicted in connection with the attack.

Police have stated that they do not plan to file charges against Alexian Lien. In December 2013, Lien filed a notice of claim regarding the city of New York for the involvement of an off-duty police detective in the attack, accusing the police department of failing to properly train their officers. As of 2018, formal proceeding to a civil suit had not occurred.

=== Defendants prosecuted ===
Christopher Cruz, who collided with Lien's vehicle at the beginning of the incident, was arraigned in Manhattan on charges of reckless driving and criminal imprisonment. Cruz pleaded guilty to second-degree assault and riot and was sentenced to four months in jail and five years probation.

Motorcyclist Reggie Chance, who was identified as the one who broke Lien's window with his helmet, turned himself in to Manhattan's 33rd Precinct on October 4. Chance pleaded guilty to felony assault and criminal mischief in exchange for two years in prison and three years post-release supervision.

Robert Sims of Brooklyn, who is shown on the video attempting to open the SUV's driver's door, turned himself in to Manhattan's 33rd Precinct on October 4. Sims is also alleged to have attempted to pull Lien's wife out of the vehicle. Robert Sims and Wojciech Braszczok were tried together, opting to have a judge decide the verdict instead of a jury. On June 9, 2015, Sims was convicted of attempted gang assault, second-degree assault, coercion, riot and criminal possession of a weapon. He was sentenced to three and a half years in prison. He was acquitted of the top charge of first-degree gang assault.

Off-duty undercover officer Wojciech Braszczok was initially charged with assault, gang assault, riot and criminal mischief. Braszczok is not believed to have physically assaulted Lien, but was charged with assault because he was part of the larger group involved in the attack. He was allegedly captured on video wearing a black vest that said "Front Line Soldiers" on the back, punching and kicking the SUV. Braszczok asserted that he never harmed Lien and was hitting the vehicle to maintain his cover. Prosecutors argue that "Braszczok completely abdicated his responsibility as a police officer by first and foremost failing to take any action." He testified that he was unable to help Lien because, without his badge and gun, he was helpless to stop the melee. "I didn’t think they would have believed me that I was a cop," he said. "I wish I could have done more to help the driver." Braszczok said he followed Lien to detain him after hitting Mieses, but was unable to do so for safety reasons. On June 9, 2015, Braszczok was convicted of second-degree assault, coercion, riot and criminal mischief. He was acquitted of the top charge of first-degree gang assault. Braszczok received one year on the assault conviction and one year for coercion. The sentences for those charges will run concurrently. He also received one year for criminal mischief for breaking the SUV's window. This sentence will run consecutively with the other two, leaving him with two years in jail. Braszczok was fired from the NYPD for his role in the attack.

Jason Brown pleaded guilty to second-degree assault and riot and was sentenced to three and a half years in prison.

Several defendants accepted plea deals. Allen Edwards and Edwin Rodriguez were each sentenced to five years probation on charges of second-degree assault and first-degree rioting. Craig Wright, Kalik Douglas, and James Kuehne also pleaded guilty to the same charges, and were sentenced to two years in prison and three years post-release supervision. Clint Caldwell, who played a more minor role, pleaded guilty to the same charges and was sentenced to one year in prison.

=== Legislation ===
Lawmakers attempted to introduce motorcycle safety legislation that would require a permit for gatherings of 50 or more motorcycles, and notification to the communities through which they would be riding. "We’re not splicing atoms here. This is something that's very not uncommon. You know, permits are required for all kinds of public assembly and activities, and there should be a similar process for motorcycles", said state senator Adriano Espaillat. The legislation was inspired by the September 29 incident as well as the death of Marian Kurshik, 78, in December 2013 after being struck by a motorcycle traveling in a pack and performing stunts. The driver of the motorcycle was also killed in the accident. "His feet was [sic] on the seat; the front wheel pulled up. He was going very fast", said a bystander. "This not only, I think, protects pedestrians. I think it also protects the motorcyclists themselves", said Espaillat.

== See also ==
- New York City Police Department corruption and misconduct
- Road rage
- Motorcycle hooliganism
