= Motobirds =

British stunt performer

Motobirds were the UK's first all-women motorcycle stunt riding display group.

They were formed in 1972, following a Leicester Mercury ad seeking girls to ride motorcycles. They appeared at shows across Europe and on TV, "often wearing little more than a bikini and a short skirt".

In 2016, six of the original members were reunited on BBC TV's The One Show.

In 2026, two of the original members appeared on ITV4s The Motorbike Show with Henry Cole.
