= Motorcycle hooliganism =

Use of a motorcycle for anti-social behavior

Motorcycle hooliganism includes street racing, street stunting, and games of tag on public roads, or simply cruising, often in very large numbers, against local ordinances.

== Demographics ==
Historian Jeremy Packer wrote that the newest motorcycle "gangs" are unlike the outlaw motorcycle clubs widely reported in the media since the late 1940s. They now ride sport bikes, often customized in the streetfighter style, rather than cruisers, passing through both rural and urban areas, playing "elaborate games of tag and follow the leader, continually pushing each other to ride harder." Besides being younger and favoring high-performance motorcycles, these groups are "loosely affiliated and come together mostly to ride." Traditional outlaw motorcycle clubs are known for having detailed charters and membership lists, prescribing codes of behavior, dress, type and brand of motorcycle members may ride, and vigorously enforcing procedures for admitting new members, banishing members who break club rules, and protecting the club's territory and name from anyone falsely pretending to be a member.

Packer wrote in 2008 that media attention, such as the popular A&E television documentary The Wild Ride of the Outlaw Bikers (1999) and the Guggenheim show The Art of the Motorcycle, erroneously only covered the baby boomer Harley-Davidson rider culture, failing to note a shift in demographics, bikes, and behavior. Packer said this promotes the Harley-Davidson brand and promotes "a type of motorcycle affiliation that is palatable, family friendly, and marketable" as part of a narrative that outlaw bikers, "though once a dangerous element, are now a useful and even valuable part of society." The StarPhoenix of Saskatoon wrote that the new marketing push to "transform motorcycling into an acceptable, mainstream pastime" has led to young riders rebelling.

In Los Angeles and New York City, some affluent urban motorcycle owners are self-described hooligans, or display motorcycles described as "hooligan chic" and an "object of fetish consumerism."

== Behaviors ==
Hooligans engage in many types of unlawful behavior.

=== Vandalism, theft and petty crime ===
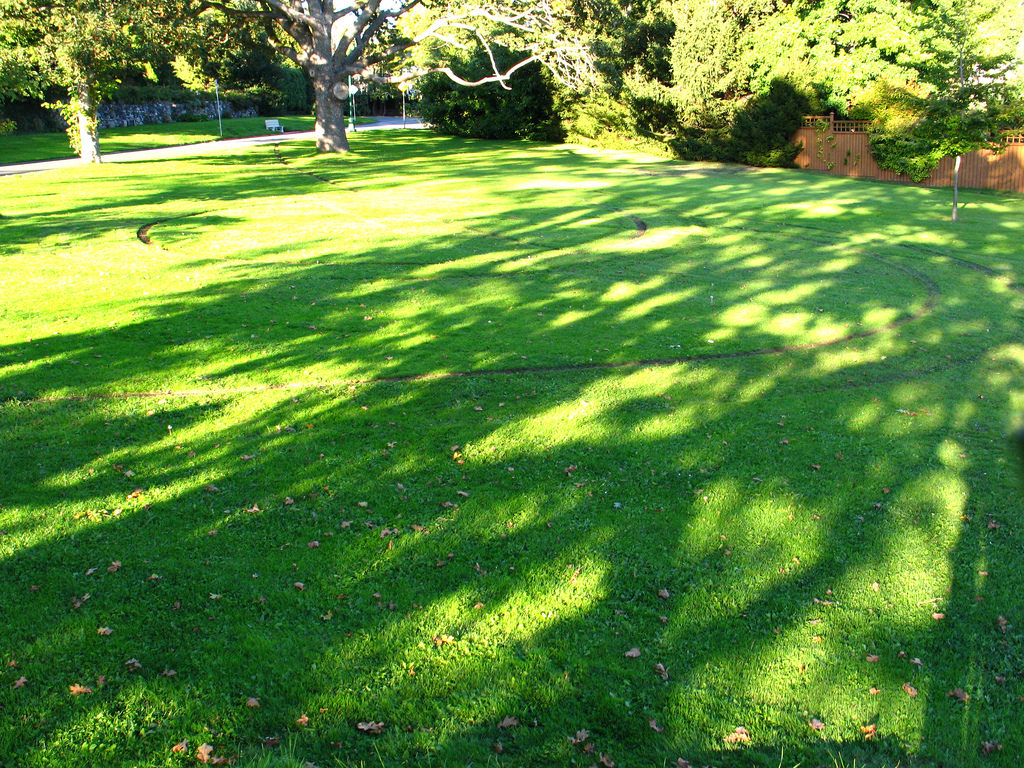
Park lawn damaged by motorcycle hooligans in Victoria, BC. 2007.

In South and Southeast Asia, thieves use motorcycles in the act of purse snatching.

=== Racing on public roads ===
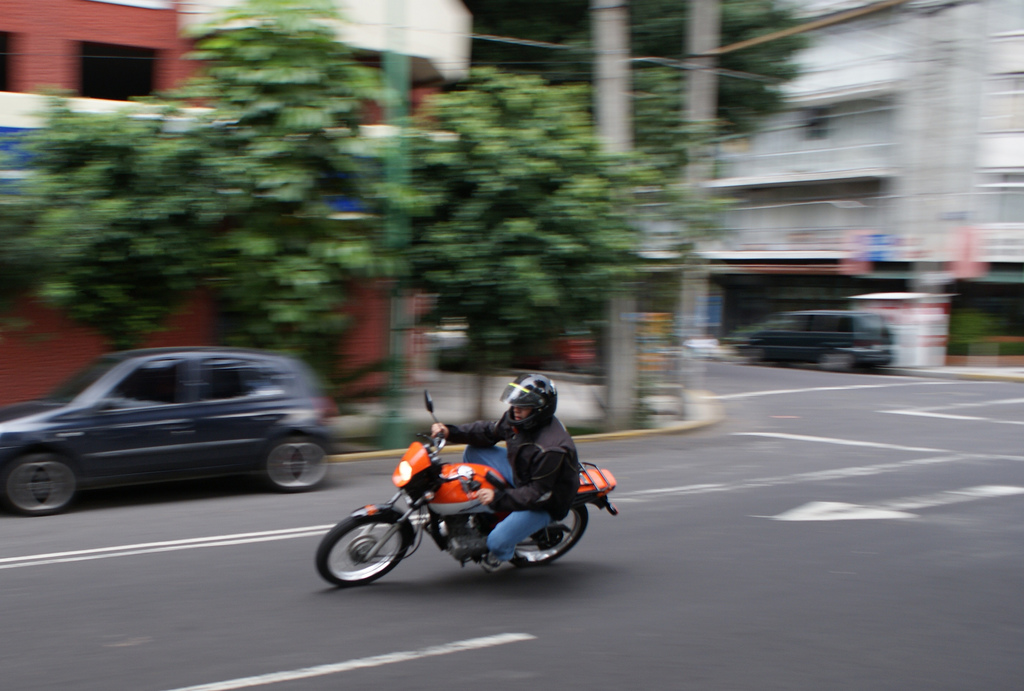
Street racing in Mexico, 2008.

Racing has been implicated in a number of deaths, and is targeted by law enforcement in North America, Asia and Europe.

=== Stunting on public roads ===
The fact that many stunters perform their stunts on public roads draws the ire of other motorcyclists and lawmakers. They intentionally draw a lot of attention to their apparently reckless behavior, and other motorcyclists, especially sportbike riders, feel that stunters give all riders a reputation for being irresponsible and dangerous to others.

The average Joe thinks that just riding a motorcycle on a public highway is only slightly less dangerous than searching for land mines with a butter knife. A motorcycle with the front wheel even an inch off the ground looks totally out of control to them, to say nothing of one dragging its taillight. No surprise that the sight of four guys hoisting Standups sends them running for the 911.

— Greg Walsh, Super Streetbike

These stupid tricks are accompanied by outrageously fast speeds, applied in all the wrong situations. All, of course, to be done on the street and with motorcycles that have the power-to-weight ratio of Trident missiles. The results, as I'm sure many of you have seen for yourselves, are often disastrous. In the process, there is plenty injury, death, and a mountain of totaled motorcycles, the repercussions of which are felt by every responsible rider on the street to one degree or another.

— Tim Kreitz (moto-journalist & Motorcycle Safety Foundation instructor

=== Riding nude ===
While clothing-optional bicycling is allowed in many places, similar behavior by motorcyclists is often seen as reckless and has even led to accidents when the rider was stung by an insect.

Nude rider complaints are recorded in Coventry, England, where 21 riders proceeded naked through the town; Salt Lake City; Murfreesboro, Tennessee (claimed to be the first nude motorcycle rally); Providence, Rhode Island; and southern Sweden.

=== Cruising ===
In some jurisdictions, the act of cruising is unlawful.

In Malaysia, over 100,000 outlaw motorcyclists called Mat Rempit are reported to cruise and race on the streets every night.

=== Unlicensed riding ===
Riders, including under-age youth, without a valid driver's license, have been described as "dangerous and illegal" and "hooligans."

Street stunt riders on unlicensed dirtbikes are reported to be a problem in Baltimore, Maryland.

=== Speeding ===
Speeding is often referred to as a "hooligan" activity due to inherent risk to the public.

== "Hooligan" motorcycles ==
Some types of motorcycles or specific models associated with hooligan behavior are informally referred to as "hooligan" motorcycles.

== Notable examples ==
In Seattle in 2010, a Washington State Patrol highway police trooper rolled his patrol car while chasing speeding motorcyclists, who then returned to jeer and taunt him. The motorcyclists said they were engaging in a semi-organized mass ride. The event attracted much media attention.

In September 2013, public awareness of motorcycle hooliganism in America was increased when a video was uploaded to LiveLeak showing a violent altercation between a family riding in an SUV and a group of motorcyclists in New York City. The bikers were participating in an annual unsanctioned rally called the "Hollywood Block Party". Over 1000 motorcycles, quads, and other vehicles participated in the 2012 rally a year prior, according to New York Police Commissioner Ray Kelly. The rally involved performing stunts and driving through Times Square, which has been illegal since it was pedestrianized in 2009.

The incident began when a sport utility vehicle (SUV) driven by motorist Alexian Lien was involved in light bumper contact with motorcyclist Christopher Cruz. Cruz reportedly sustained minor injuries. In the video, Cruz merges in front of Lien and slows dramatically, apparently causing the collision. Following the incident, authorities familiar with such organized rides stated that Cruz was not attempting to cause a collision, but was attempting to slow traffic in order to clear a section of roadway to perform stunts on their motorcycles.

Lien and many of the motorcyclists stopped their vehicles. The video shows many of the bikers gathering around the Range Rover driven by Lien. Police reported that the bikers were beating on the vehicle and punctured a tire. Lien accelerated to escape, reportedly driving over 3 motorcycles and a rider, named Edwin Mieses, who had dismounted and was in front of the Range Rover. Mieses was severely injured, including a fractured spine and punctured lung. The bikers then chased after the SUV for several miles before pulling Lien from the vehicle and assaulting him.

The video of the incident quickly went viral and received widespread news coverage. Other videos of packs of bikers driving recklessly and performing stunts surfaced following the heavy news coverage. One video in particular shows a group of bikers threatening the driver of a Prius. The bikers beat on the window of his car, but the driver was unharmed.

A total of 15 people were arrested, 55 motorcycles were confiscated, and 69 summonses were issued in connection with the September 29th event. Nine suspects have been charged in connection with the attack. In December 2013, Lien filed a civil suit against the city of New York for the involvement of an off-duty police detective in the attack. The suit accused the police department of failing to properly train their officers.

Legislation has since been proposed that would require permits and prior notification of such rallies. The legislation was inspired by the September 29 incident as well as the death of Marian Kurshik, 78, in December 2013 after being struck by a motorcycle traveling in a pack and performing stunts. The driver of the motorcycle was also killed in the accident. "His feet was on the seat; the front wheel pulled up. He was going very fast," said a bystander. "This not only, I think, protects pedestrians. I think it also protects the motorcyclists themselves," said state senator Andriano Espaillat.

== See also ==
- 12 O'Clock Boys
- Mat Rempit
