= Doug Domokos =

Motorcycle stunt performer

- Born: December 31, 1955; Niles, Michigan, US
- Died: November 26, 2000 (aged 44); Murrieta, California, US
- Other name: The Wheelie King
- Known for: World Record holder for the World's Longest Wheelie
- Children: 1

Doug Domokos (December 31, 1955 – November 26, 2000), nicknamed, "The Wheelie King," was an American stunt motorcyclist and former World Record holder for the World's Longest Wheelie.

== Early life ==
Domokos was born in Niles, Michigan, on December 31, 1955. He began riding motorcycles at the age of 15 and was hooked instantly. Doug would ride motorcycles in his free time, mostly by abandoned railroad terminal grounds near his house. He soon became a talented motocross racer. Later, he began working as a mechanic at a local motorcycle shop, Red Bud Cycle. Sometimes after working on a motorcycle, he would take it for a quick "test drive" by doing wheelies on it. During the motocross events at Red Bud MX, Domokos would ride his motorcycle and during intermissions perform a wheelie show of his own for the crowd. From an early age, Domokos loved having the crowd's attention.

== Career ==
In the 1970s, Domokos began performing shows professionally at RedBud events, with the help of the owner, Gene Ritchie. Years later in 1978, Domokos caught the attention of Kawasaki's Bryon Farnsworth, who liked what he saw. Soon after, Doug was given a new Kawasaki bike and a new Toyota pickup truck to travel all around the U.S. doing shows. By the late 70's Domokos was performing at stadiums and tracks nationwide. He gained national attention and was even featured in some motorcycle magazines. His hobby of stunt riding motorcycles was turning into a career.

In 1981, Domokos left Kawasaki and signed with Honda. Domokos and Honda worked together to engineer custom motorcycles for Domokos that did wheelies better. By then, he was traveling all over the world to wheelie for all kinds of people. With Honda he went to England, France, Netherlands, Italy, Mexico, and South America. He also performed in Japan for the Emperor. Three years later, Domokos attempted to break the world record for the longest wheelie on a motorcycle. He made it into the Guinness Book of World Records with his 145-mile-long wheelie at Talladega Speedway. This record would stand for over eight years. Domokos had many other accomplishments, including the World's Tallest Wheelie by doing five circles on the roof of the Empire State Building. Also, he held the world records for wheelying with eight passengers on a three-wheeler and six passengers on an ATV.

== Accomplishments ==
Domokos held many world records such as the World's Longest Wheelie, and the World's Tallest Wheelie. He was featured in countless magazines and videos, and even wrote his own book, "Wheelyin' with the King." From the 1980s to 1990's motorsport fans worldwide knew his name. Also, Domokos performed many shows to help raise money for various charities and organizations.

On November 26, 2000, Domokos died at age 44 in an ultralight aircraft accident in Murrieta, California. Domokos' instructor, Keith Lamb, was also killed. Domokos and his fiancée had one son, Nikolas.
