= Motorcycle stunt riding =

Motorcycle acrobatic sport

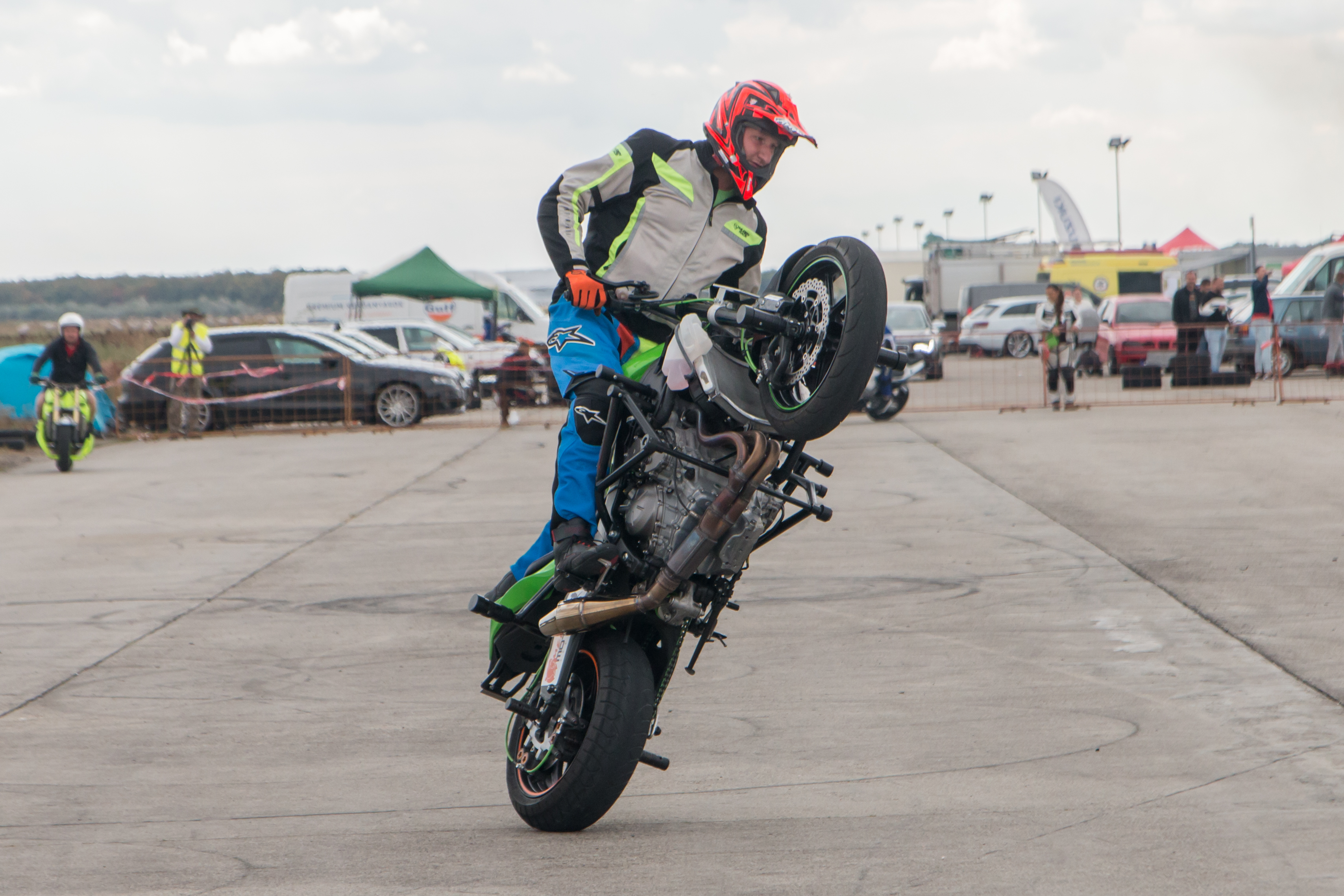
Streetbike freestyle (stunt riding)

Motorcycle stunt riding is a motorsport which involves stunts known as wheelies, stoppies, acrobatics, burnout, drifting, and jumping. Motorcycles are sometimes modified to do multiple tricks (handbreak, subcage, crashcage, stopper, etc.).

== Stunters ==
Stunters are a controversial subculture of motorcycling. Stunters perform motorcycle stunts on motor bikes, both on public roads and in private venues. Some stunters have organized commercial teams.

== History ==
Jagath Perera performing various motorcycle stunts on a 1928 Indian Scout in a Wall of Death

A wheelie on a motorized vehicle is a relatively common phenomenon. In drag racing they are considered a problem, robbing power that could be used to accelerate the vehicle faster, and many classes of drag racing use wheelie bars to prevent them.

However, those are for vehicles specifically built for drag racing, which rarely are street-legal, or unmodified from stock. In contrast, since at least the 1970s, some motorcycles straight from the showroom floor were able to be wheelied.

One of the original public stunts done on a motorcycle was riding the Globe of Death. In this stunt, one or more riders enter a steel banded sphere through a trap door and begin circling. The centripetal force of accelerating along the curve allows the rider to eventually circle on any plane inside the sphere, including sideways and upside-down. Though this is one of the original stunts, it is still commonly seen among circus acts.

In the late 1980s and continuing today, motorcycles, and especially sportbikes, have become lighter and more powerful, and have therefore become easier to wheelie. Other stunts have also become possible if not easy with the advancement of motorcycle technology. As Martin Child wrote in Bike, "With lighter, shorter, better-braked bikes on the market, the stoppie has never been so easy for so many." But at the same time, the cost of a motorcycle has remained relatively low compared to other street-legal vehicles with similar power-to-weight ratios.

In the 1990s some riders made performing stunts the primary focus of their riding. A wheelie or other stunt was not just something to do while riding, it became the main goal in this type of riding. Towards the mid 90s, modern stunt riding began to gain traction as riders would take these antics to the highway. A few groups of riders came about during this time, the most well known and popular being the Starboyz. They would regularly film each other performing high speed dangerous motorcycle stunts on the highway. They were also the first to release tapes commercially with the main content being highway stunts and various slow speed stunts. As the 90s came to an end, stunt riding had begun to grow bigger with more and more people coming into the new style of riding. It was extremely controversial with many news outlets reporting on it and local police in different areas realizing it may be a problem that will be difficult to address. By 1999, many groups and teams had formed and films were being made on motorcycle stunt riding. Riders began to pioneer new tricks and throw actual events. Among these events, was the stunt fest stunt competition. First introduced in the year 2000 and held at the Lakeland drag strip in Florida, it allowed competition and organized stunt riding to become more widespread.

== Equipment ==
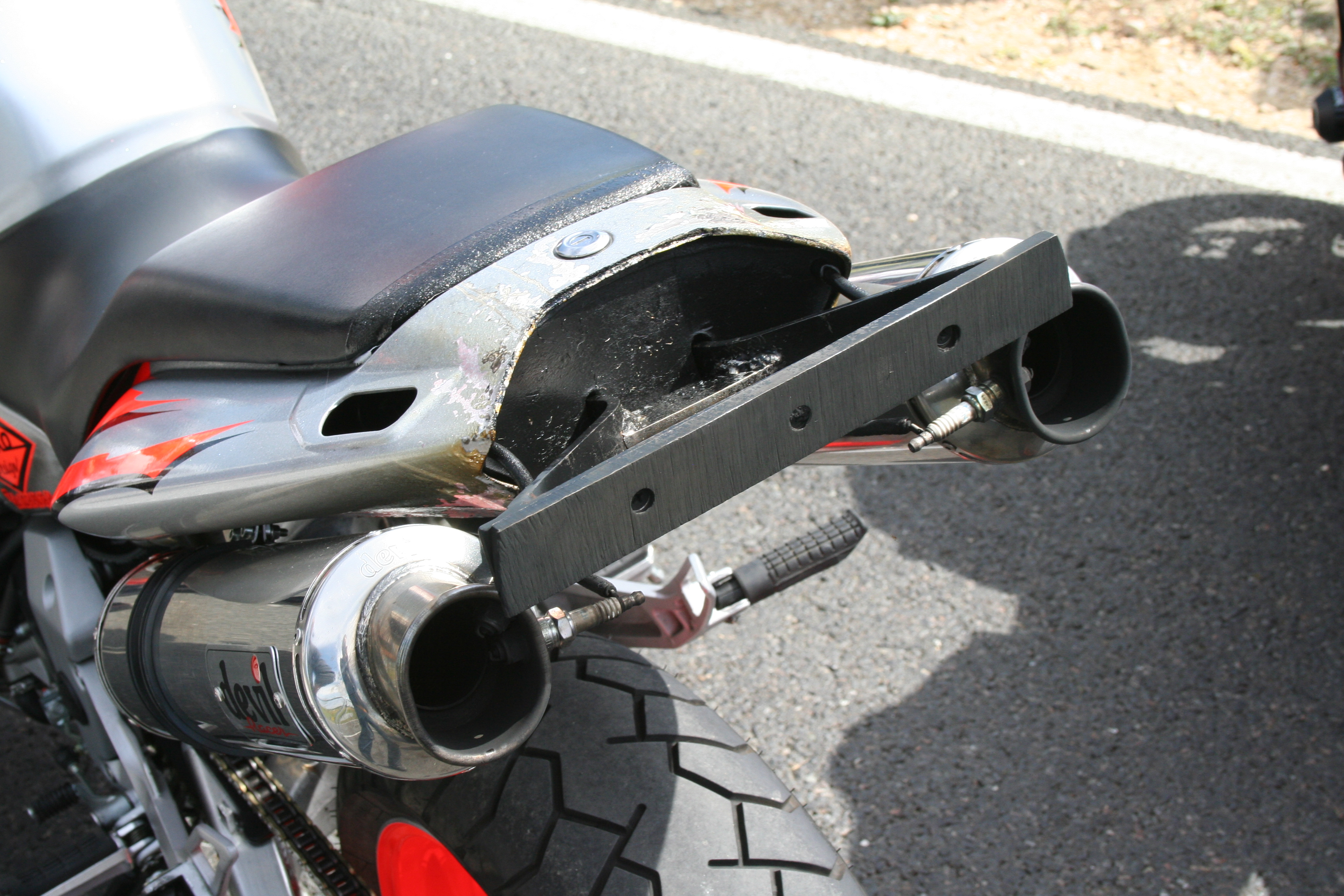
Scrape bar

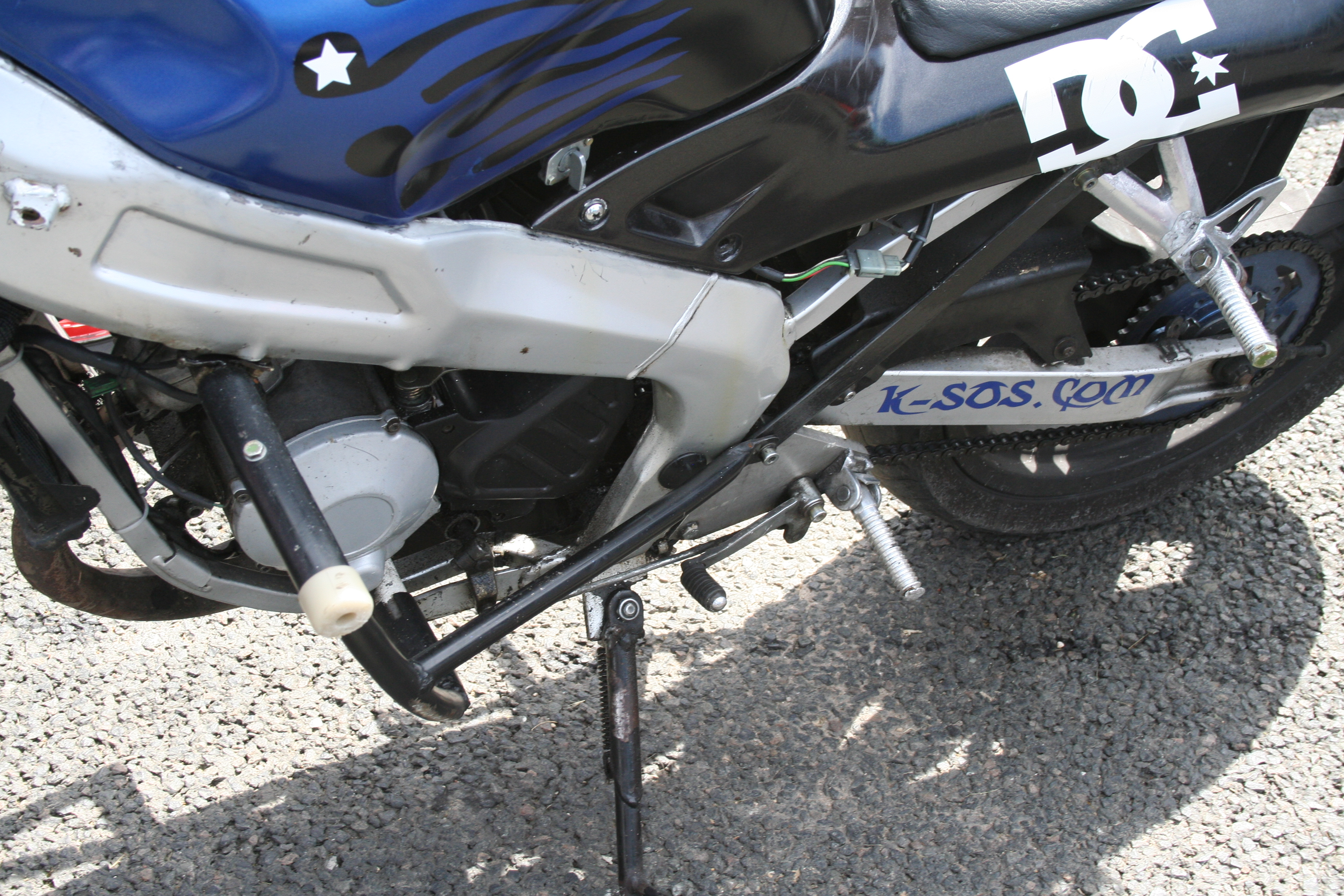
Crash cage

Stunters often modify their motorcycles to better adapt them to the sport. Stunting equipment includes:

- Frame sliders – These large knobs are attached to a motorcycle's frame to protect the fairing from damage should the rider lay down the bike, and are used by many non-stunters. Frame sliders should not be considered a substitute for a cage when learning how to stunt. Although Frame sliders will reduce the damage to the plastics and certain parts of the bike they are not enough to keep from cracking motor cases and or cracking the frame itself.
- Crash cages – These cages provide more protection from damage than frame sliders and are mostly used by stunters. There are many examples of cages on the market today and a vast array of different designs and styles. It is very important to search for cages specifically designed to your bike's make and model to work best at maximizing the protection for your specific motorcycle. A cage should be one of the first things purchased when learning how to stunt due to the fact that most drops and falls will occur during this time.
- Subcages – Subcages are very similar to crash cages, but for protection of a different sort. While crash cages are protection for the frame itself, motor mounts and cases subcages focus on protecting the subframe of the motorcycle. In certain cases, subcage applications will also eliminate the stock passenger pegs and relocate them to a different spot. This is more becoming for staggered stance wheelies among other tricks. These pegs will in some cases be solid mounted to eliminate the possibility of them folding up on the rider when doing wheelies on the passenger pegs.
- Front upper stay – This bracket is meant to replace the upper stay on the motorcycle which usually holds the upper fairing and gauges in place. This is only necessary when running a full fairing bike and is meant in like fashion as both the subcage and crash cage to protect the front of the bike and provide increased stability for the front end of the motorcycle. This will not save the front fairing from damage.
- 12 o'clock bar – 12 bars, as they are referred to, are commonly used on stunt bikes. These bars attach to the subframe of the motorcycle and are used when 12ing the bike. These bars are meant to scrape the ground in place of the exhaust or tail section. Furthermore, with the introduction of the 12 bar came an array of bar tricks which all occur while the motorcycle is resting on the bar itself. These tricks include the ape hanger, watch tower, and various other acrobatics while the bike is on the bar. This modification is only used by stunters.
- Handbrake – The handbrake came onto the stunting scene much later and in actuality within recent years gained popularity. With the sport pushing its bounds into new territory came tricks that involved the rider in a position in which he cannot access the rear brake to control the balance point of the motorcycle. When tricks such as seat standers, highchairs, and spreaders came on the scene at first it was not necessary to use a handbrake, however these tricks quickly developed into scraping while in a highchair or spreader which involved the use of a hand-mounted rear brake
- Round bar – A variation of the 12 bar, round bars have become popular with riders straying away from bar tricks and increasing the technicality of circle combinations. A round bar is the same principle as a 12 bar as far as scraping the bar instead of the tail section or exhaust, with one difference. The round bar is a curved bar that hugs the contour of the motorcycle tail section with no flat sections.
- Sprocket kit - Most stunters upgrade the gearing to allow for slower wheelies. Typical gearing consists of 1 down (−1) for the front sprocket and anywhere from 55 tooth to 85 tooth for the rear sprocket.

== Legality ==
Stunt riding has been a target for law enforcement since the existence of these motorcycles. Up until the 2000s, it was extremely uncommon however. Stunt riding is a crime when performed on public roads (Or even private property that has a contract with police to enforce laws within their property) For example: Large plazas with stop signs. It comes with hefty fines, and consequences. Some states are 1500 for a wheelie ticket first offense, second is a 2000 dollar ticket, and bike confiscation, with loss of license, and as of recently in Florida your third offense is a felony.

Stunt riding is a grey area as far as legality goes when in a private lot or property. Most often, riders who have a legitimate passion for the sport and attempt it legally often find it extremely difficult to find anywhere to practice. Many private properties with any sort of asphalt paving down large enough, often have trespass orders for anyone who is on site after hours. Police, whether driving by or summoned by an angry civilian will often kick riders out of areas. The lack of understanding for the sport makes it difficult for anyone to truly understand why people continue to ride despite the difficulty.

Since takeovers and drifting have become an issue throughout the United States, police have also had (even though its nearly dead) motorcycle stunt riding on their radar to enforce heavy fines against.

== Common stunts ==
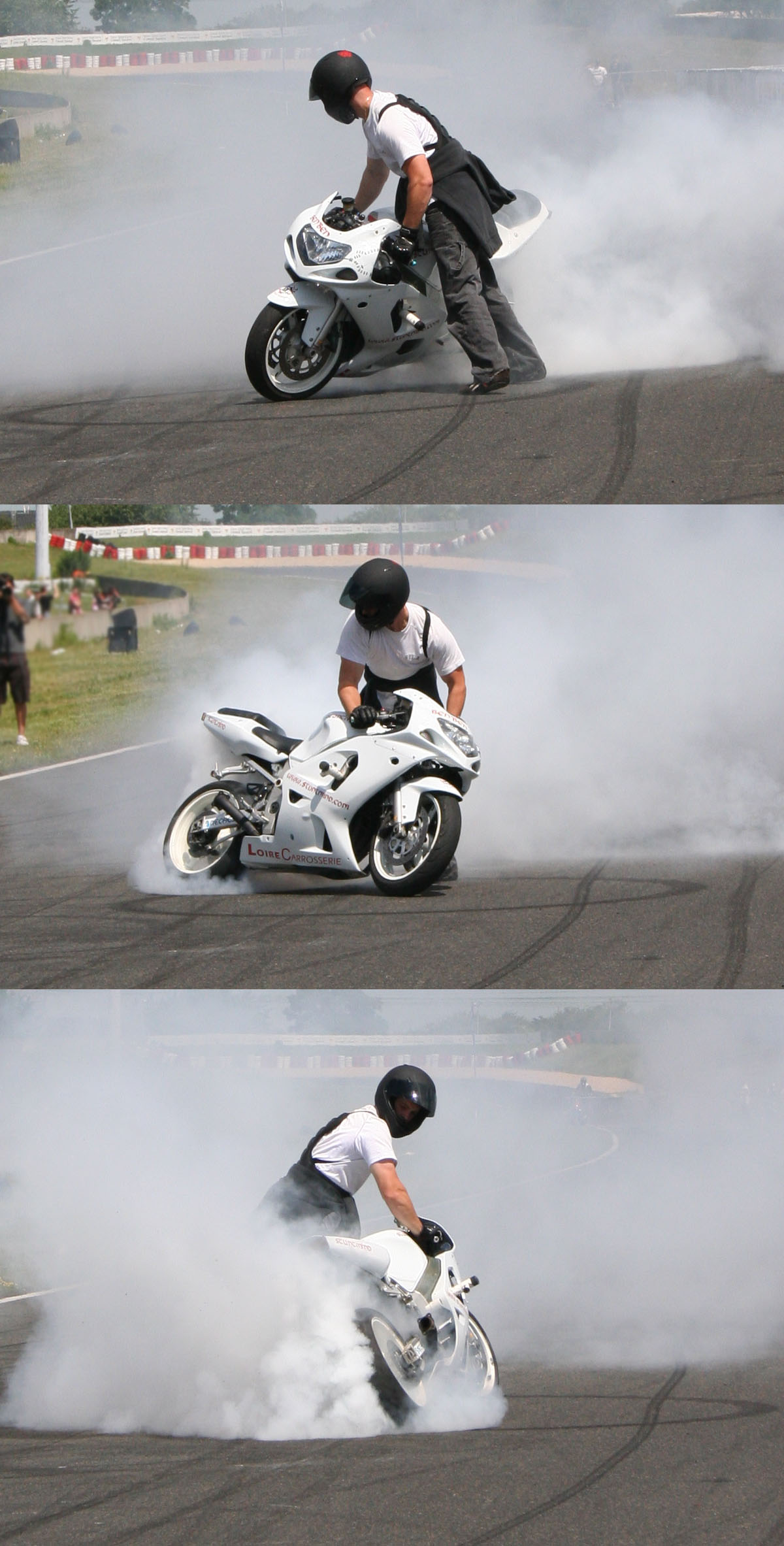
Stopped burn at Circuit Carole, France

=== Wheelies ===
A basic wheelie is the lifting of the front of the motorcycle off the ground by means of either power or use of clutching. There are many variations of the basic wheelie.

Power wheelies – This wheelie can be done by either accelerating rapidly in a low gear, or by reaching the power band and then chopping the throttle.

The clutch-up is done by either slipping the clutch lever during acceleration, or by completely pulling in the clutch, riding up the rpm's, and then quickly releasing, or 'dumping' the clutch.

The "circle" is a wheelie performed traveling entirely within a circle, which is very difficult to do. Even more difficult is a circle wheelie with the rider's right foot on the left peg, which is called a "Ralph Loui".

The "high chair" is a wheelie with the rider's legs over the handlebars, while a "tank wheelie" is one in which rider sits on the tank with legs spread. A "frog" is a wheelie in which the rider stands on the tank, and a "seat stander" is performed with the rider standing on the motorcycle's saddle. Standing on the windshield while riding the bike at 12 o'clock is called a "watch tower".

The "12 o'clock" is a very high wheelie, past the normal balance point of the motorcycle. A variation of this is the "coaster", in which the bike is balanced without the acting force of the motor, that is, with the clutch pulled in. The motorcycle is pulled so far back beyond the balance point of the wheel that the rider must constantly ride the rear brake to keep the machine from falling over backwards, causing it to slow down. A rider can pull in the clutch to create the effect of a wheelie with no engine noise. Conversely, some riders will pull in the clutch and peg the engine on its rev-limiter, called a "rev-limiter coaster".

The opposite of the 12 o'clock is a wheelie in which momentum is used to lean forward, lifting the rear wheel while continuing to move forward at a high speed — this is called a "nose wheelie".

A wheelie performed by two or more men on the same motorcycle is called "man-dom".

=== Other stunts ===
- Bar tricks
  - Ape hanger – Hanging from the bars with one's hands while doing a 12 O'clock, scraping the bike's 12 o'clock bar and allowing the riders feet to drag behind the bike.
  - Cliff hanger – Hanging from the bars with one's feet while doing a 12 O'clock.
  - Bar hop – Standing up and jumping over the handlebars while the bike is in motion.
- Stoppie or endo – Lifting the rear wheel of the motorcycle using momentum and braking force
  - Biscuit eater or highchair endo – Stoppie with the rider's legs over the handlebars

Burnouts use the power of the engine and braking force to cause the rear wheel to spin, heating the rear tire and producing smoke. There are different types of burnouts, like the "suicide burnout" with the rider dismounted and standing in front of the motorcycle. The "chainsaw" is a form of burnout performed by the stunter standing beside a motorcycle lying on its side holding the motorcycle exclusively by the right handle bar then causing the bike to "orbit" around the rider while maintaining control during the burnout. In a "merry-go-round", the rider lays the bike on its side and climbs onto it, then leans back on the bike while holding the throttle, causing the bike to spin round while doing a burnout.

- Acrobatics
  - Hyperspin – Kneeling on the right side of the bike, with the bike lying on the ground, and feathering the gas to spin around on the ground
  - Switchback – Any stunt performed with the body facing the rear of the motorcycle, opposite the direction of travel
  - Christ – A stunt performed with the rider standing straight up on the seat or tank of the motorcycle with both arms extended while the bike is in motion. Also called a "Jesus Christ" or a "Cross". Can be combined with a switchback.
  - De activator – Riding a wheelie on idle and jumping off the back of the motorcycle.

== Notable performers ==
- Dale Buggins 1978 set world record by jumping over 25 cars
- Doug Domokos (1955–2000), "The Wheelie King" – held the record for longest wheelie for 8 years after a 145 miles (233 km) wheelie at Talladega Speedway in 1984. Among his other performances were the movie The Cannonball Run and wheelies up and down Lombard Street (San Francisco).
- Royal Signals Motorcycle Display Team, "The White Helmets" – a British military team started in the 1920s and also known as the White Helmets since 1963
- Eddie Kidd, OBE (born 22 June 1959). Former British stunt rider.
- Evel Knievel, (Robert Craig Knievel Jr.) was an American stunt performer who attempted more than 75 ramp-to-ramp motorcycle jumps and was inducted into the Motorcycle Hall of Fame in 1999
- Robbie Knievel an American daredevil and son of stunt performer Evel Knievel. Robbie has completed over 350 jumps, setting 20 world records.,
- Motobirds, the UK's first all-women motorcycle stunt display group, formed in 1972
- Dave McKenna (stunt rider), Australia's number one Freestyle Street Bike Stunt Rider since 2011
- Robbie Maddison, in April 2015 successfully rode a modified dirt motorbike to surf on a wave near Teahupoo in Tahiti.
- Dave Taylor (stunt rider), The Wheelie King, active in the 70s and 80s, was the first man to wheelie around the Isle of Man TT Mountain Course

=== Cytrix display team ===
Cytrix, a display team formed by members of the White Helmets at the end of World War II, toured for 20 years up to 1967. They toured mainly the UK, but also on two occasions the US (across 23 mid-west states over 4 months) and Europe. They appeared at UK agricultural shows and at Wembley on a number of occasions during the Speedway finals. The four consistent members of the team were Basil Shelbourne, Ted Way, Jet Jones and Neil Hack. Originally they rode Matchless bikes but later rode BSA Gold Stars. Stunts were typically run at speeds of 60 mph and included tunnel-of-fire jumps. They rode without crash helmets or leathers, just shirt, tie, jodhpurs and riding boots.

== See also ==
- Bicycle and motorcycle dynamics
