= Stoppie =

Vehicle maneuver

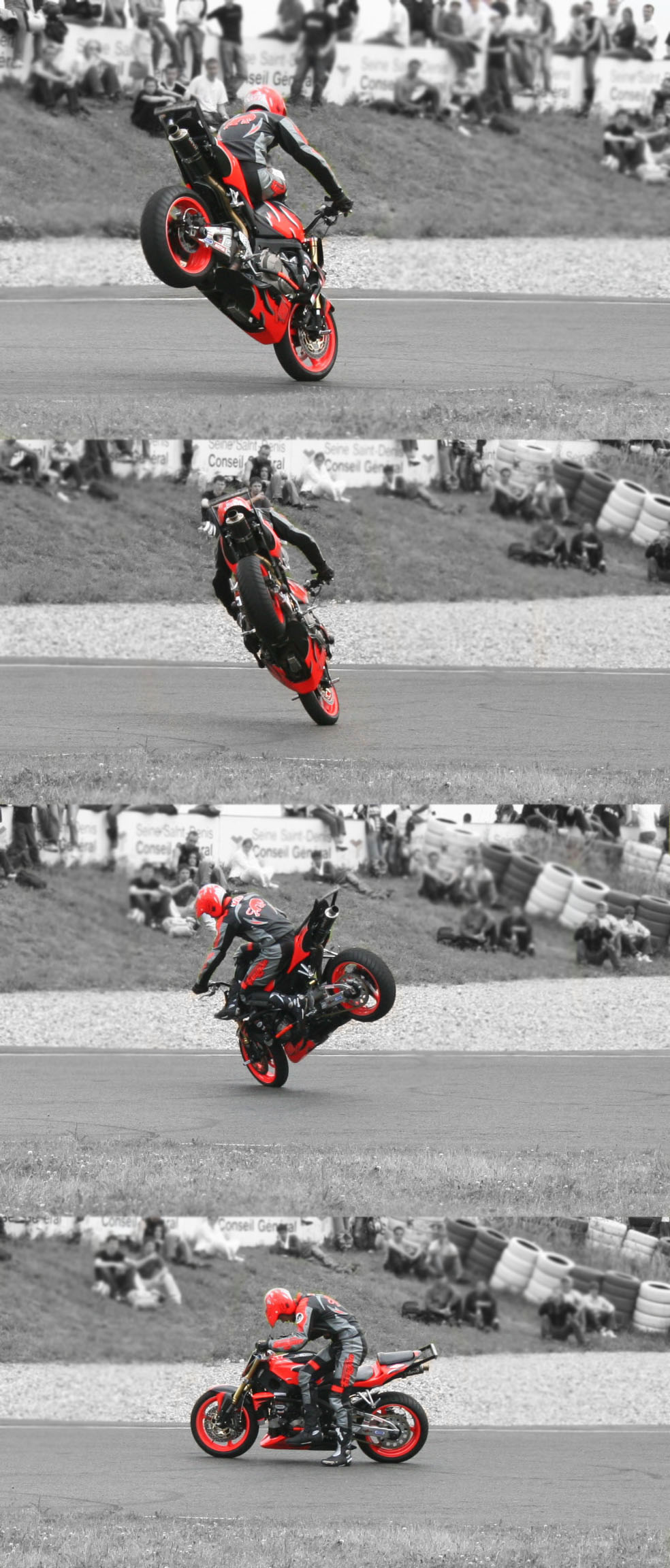
Stoppie 180, by Duke (French champion) during the Stunt Bike Show, in Carole Racetrack

The stoppie is a motorcycle and bicycle trick in which the back wheel is lifted by abruptly applying the front brake, then, by carefully reducing the brake pressure, the bike is ridden for a short distance on the front wheel. It is also called an endo, a nose manual, or less commonly, a front wheelie.

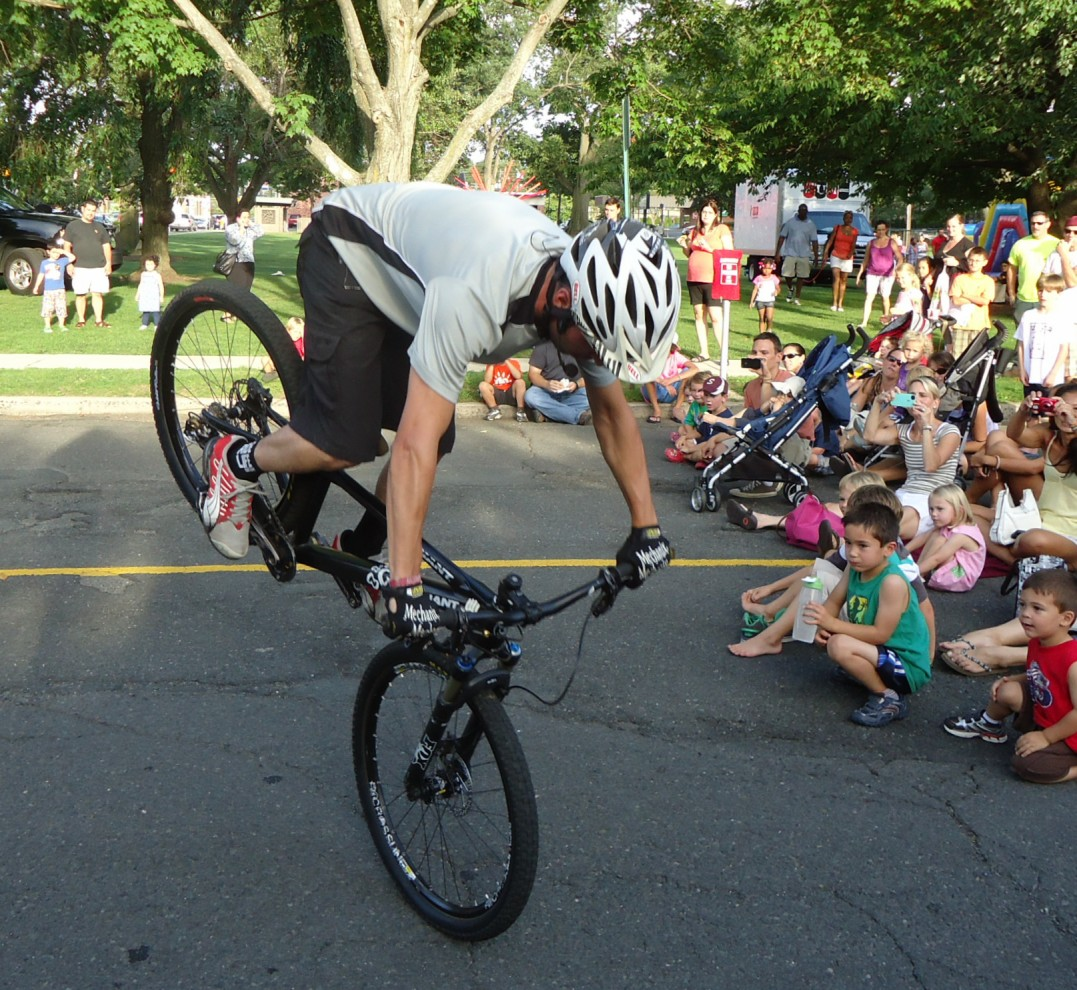
A stoppie with a mountain bike

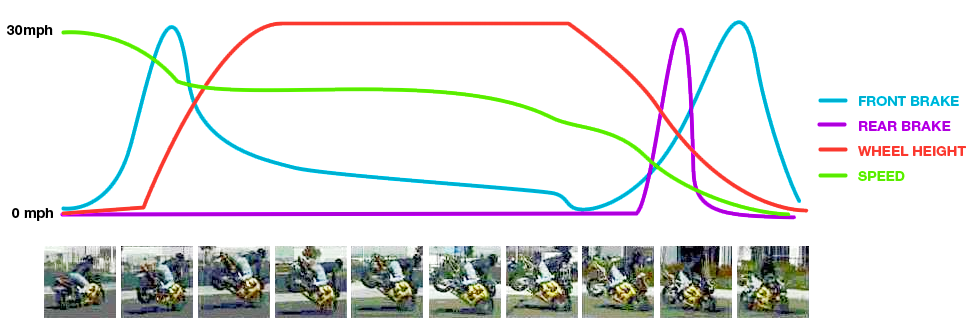
Diagram illustrating a safely executed stoppie on a sports bike

== See also ==
- Bicycle and motorcycle dynamics
- Motorcycle stunt riding
- Weight transfer
