= Wheelie =

Vehicle maneuver

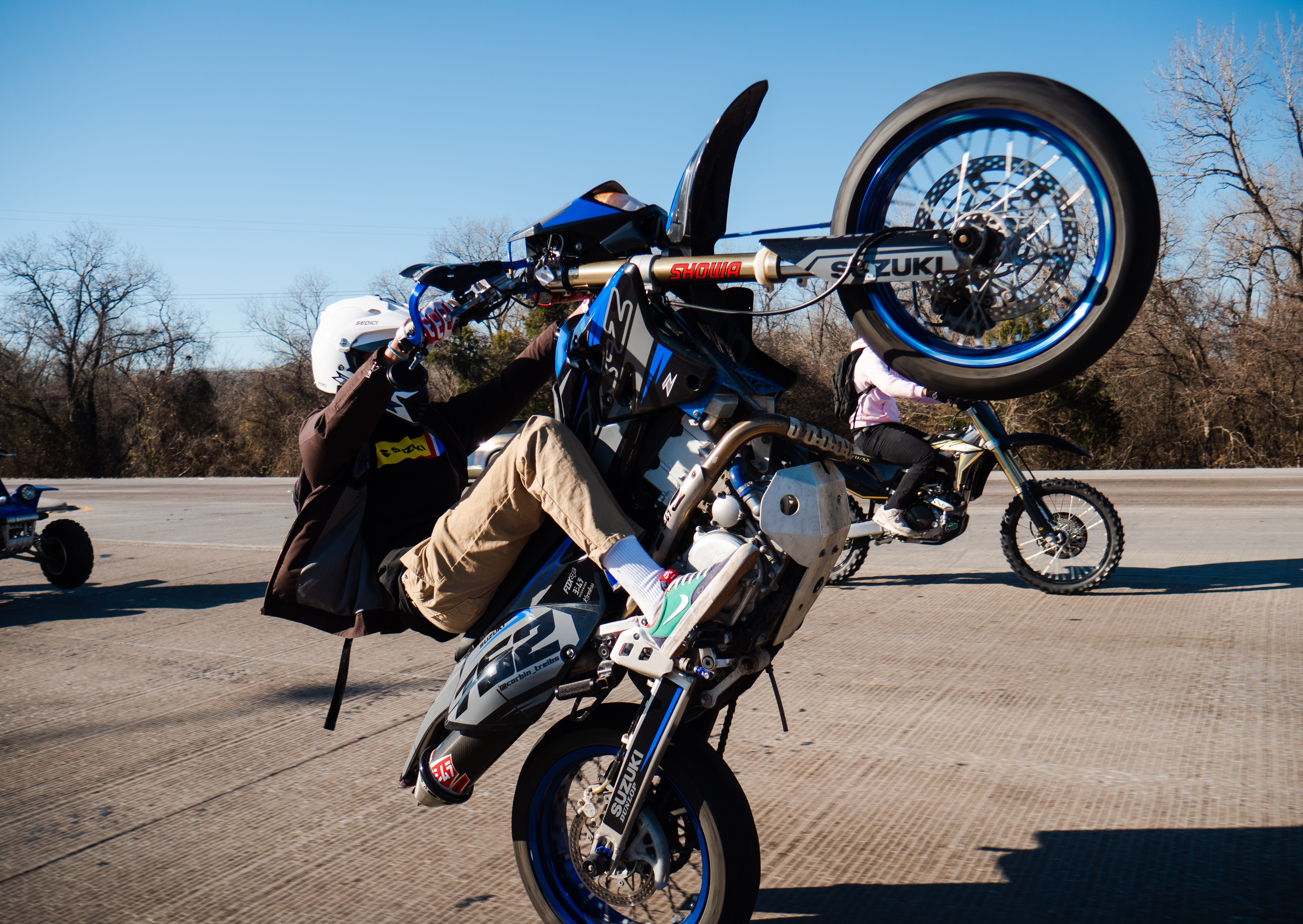
Motorcycle wheelie

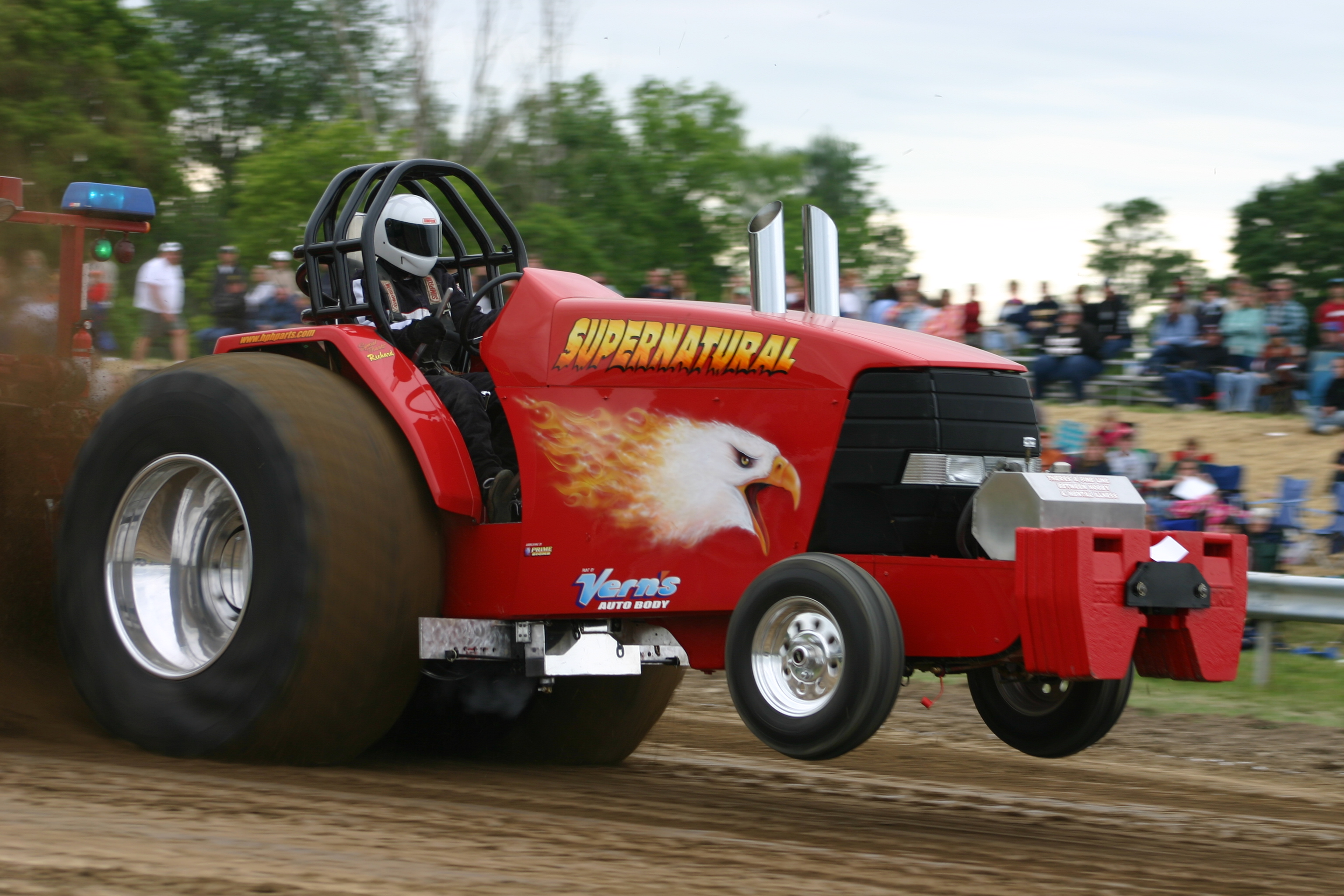
Wheelie at a tractor pull

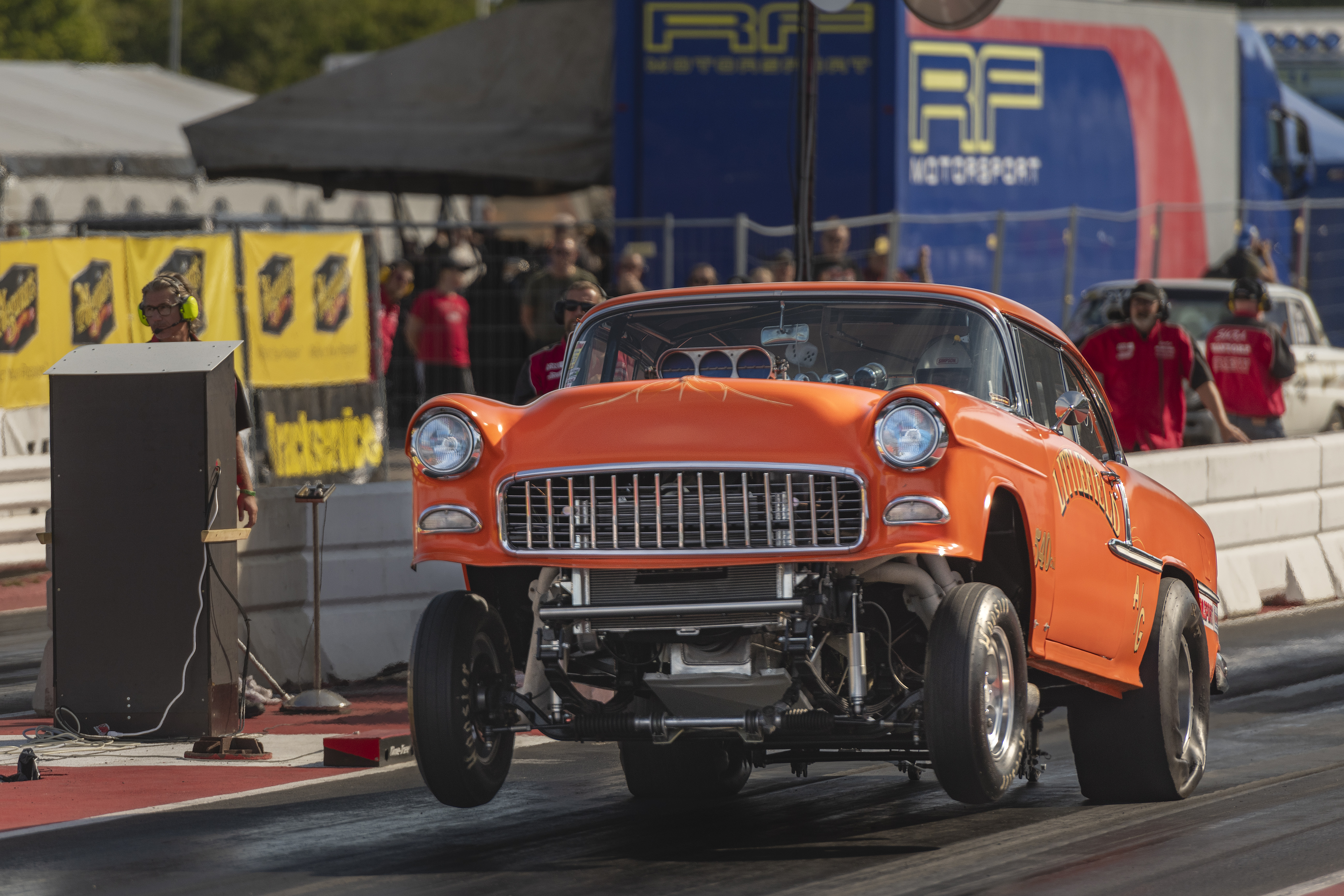
Wheelie at a drag race

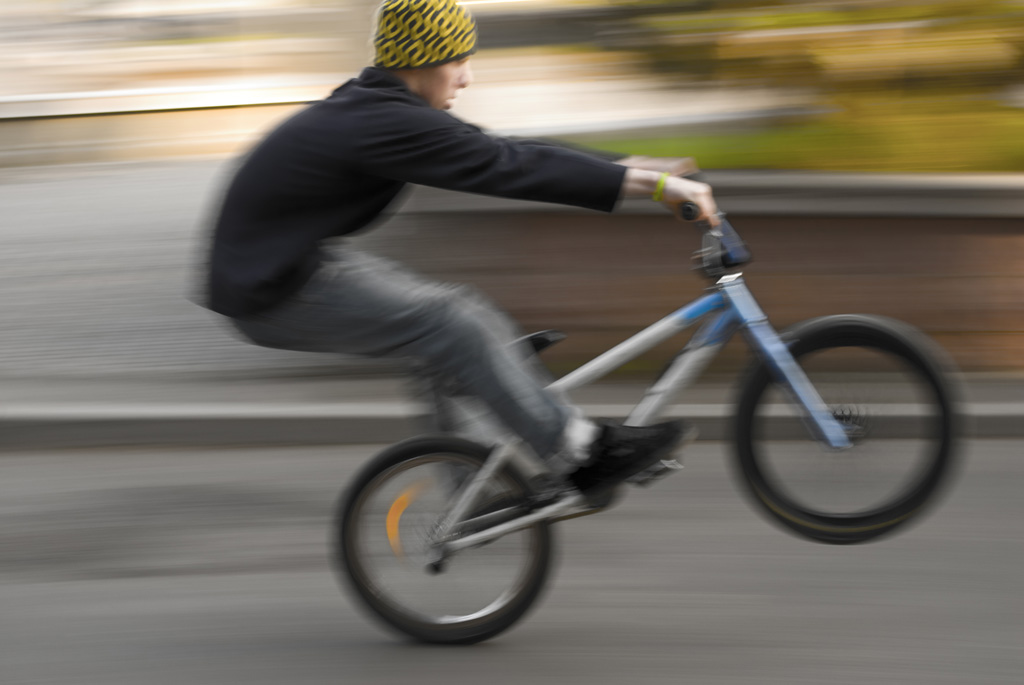
Manual on a BMX bike

A wheelie, or wheelstand, is a vehicle maneuver in vehicle acrobatics in which the front wheel or wheels come off the ground due to sufficient torque being applied to the rear wheel or wheels, or rider motion relative to the vehicle. Wheelies are usually associated with bicycles and motorcycles, but can be done with other vehicles such as cars, especially in drag racing and tractor pulling.

== History ==
Riders have made horses prance, and the wheelie might be the modern equivalent to that. The counterparts, rear legs or rear wheel in the air, is bucking or a stoppie.

The first wheelie was reportedly performed by trick bicyclist Daniel J. Canary in 1890, shortly after modern bicycles became popular. Writing in 2009, Mike Seate related to the U.S. Army motorized cavalry training in 1943, pictured in Life magazine. Seate described "vaulting trenches and beach obstacles" and interpreted this technique as "High speed wheelies, naturally". Daredevil Evel Knievel performed motorcycle acrobatics including wheelies in his shows. The world record for the longest continuous wheelie is held by Japanese stunt rider Masaru Abe, who did a wheelie for 500.5322 km (311 mi) over more than 13 hours on a Yamaha Jog motorized scooter.

== Types ==
Types of wheelie can be divided into two broad categories:

1. Wheelies in which the vehicle is driven by the rear wheels, and power is sufficient by itself as described in the Physics section below. These include:
- Clutch wheelies: performed by revving the engine with the clutch disengaged, and then abruptly engaging (a.k.a. 'dumping') the clutch.
- Power wheelies or roll-on wheelies: performed by simply opening the throttle. If the engine has sufficient power, it will be able to lift the front wheel.

2. Wheelies performed with the aid of suspension dynamics or rider motion. These include:
- Bounce wheelies or slap wheelies: performed by opening and closing the throttle in time with suspension rebounding, tire rebounding, rider motion, or any combination of the three.
- Manuals: performed without applying torque to the rear wheel at all, but instead by moving the rider's body backwards relative to the vehicle, and then, if on a vehicle with handlebars, pulling back on the handlebars near the end of available travel.

=== Bicycles ===
Wheelies are a common stunt in freestyle fixed gear, artistic cycling and freestyle BMX. The bicycle is balanced by the rider's weight and sometimes use of the rear brake. A style of bicycle, the wheelie bike, has a seating position, and thus center of mass, nearly over the rear wheel that facilitates performing wheelies.

=== Motorcycle ===
A wheelie is also a common motorcycle stunt. The principles is the same as the bicycle wheelie, but the throttle and rear brakes are used to control the wheelie while a rider uses body weight and the steering to control the direction the inertia of the spinning front wheel acting as a balance.

The world's fastest motorcycle wheelie record is 307.86 km/h (191.30 mph) by Patrik Fürstenhoff. April 18, 1999. The world record for the fastest wheelie over 1 km (0.6 mi) is 343.388 km/h (213.371 mph), set by Egbert van Popta at Elvington airfield in Yorkshire, England.

In some countries, such as the United Kingdom and USA, motorcyclists performing a wheelie on a public road may be prosecuted for dangerous driving, an offense which can carry a large fine and a ban of a year or more.

In Pakistan, India, and some other countries, it is illegal to perform these kinds of stunts. If someone is caught performing these acts, the rider can have their motorcycle impounded and potentially face jail time.

=== Automobiles ===
Wheelies are common in auto- or motorcycle drag racing, where they represent torque wasted lifting the front end, rather than moving the vehicle forward. They also usually result in raising the center of mass, which limits the maximum acceleration. In the absence of wheelie bars, this effect is quantified in the physics section below. If wheelie bars are present then a wheelie results in a reduction of load on the rear driving wheels, along with a corresponding reduction in friction.

=== Monster trucks ===
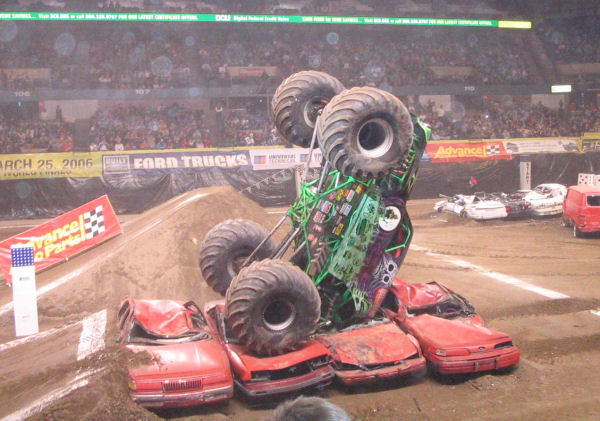
Grave Digger stuck on a set of crushed cars after performing a wheelie

Monster trucks often perform wheelies during shows. Monster trucks have performed power wheelies, slap wheelies, and sky wheelies. To perform a sky wheelie, a monster truck jumps in such a way that the truck is vertical in the air, with the front end of the truck pointing upwards.

=== Snowmobiles ===
Wheelies are possible with some snowmobiles, whereby it is the skis that are lifted off the ground.

=== Skateboards ===
Wheelies are often performed on both non-powered and powered skateboards and longboards, where they are called manuals, and can be done by lifting either the front or rear wheels off of the ground through the rider shifting their body weight.

=== Scooters ===
Wheelies are often performed on kick scooters and E-scooters, where they are called either manuals or wheelies, and can be done by moving the rider's body backwards relative to the scooter and then pulling back on the handlebars near the end of available travel.

=== Wheelchairs ===
Some wheelchair users can learn to balance their chair on its rear wheels and do a wheelie. This enables them to climb and descend curbs and maneuver over small obstacles. Occasionally wheelchair dancers perform wheelies.

=== Aircraft ===
In an airplane, a wheelie is performed by conducting a soft-field landing or take-off procedure. The pilot increases the elevator backpressure so the nose wheel of the landing gear has minimal contact with the ground.

On 14 February 2020, the Guinness World Record for the longest-distance wheelie in an airplane was set in a Cessna 172 at Southern California Logistics Airport in Victorville, California on runway 17. The pilot kept the plane's nose wheel from touching the runway for a distance of 14,319 feet (4,364 m).

== Wheelie bar ==
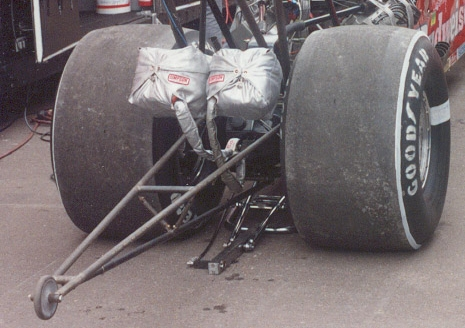
The wheelie bar (foreground) and parachute (gray) on Kenny Bernstein's Top Fuel dragster

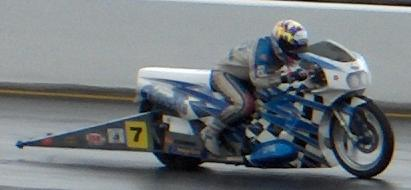
A wheelie bar on a drag racing Pro Stock Motorcycle

A wheelie bar helps prevent a vehicle's front end from raising too high or flipping over. A bar is required for some tractor and truck pull events. Wham-O developed and sold an add-on wheelie bar for wheelie bikes.

== Physics ==
A wheelie is imminent when the acceleration is sufficient to reduce the load borne by the front axle to zero. The conditions for this can be calculated with the so-called "weight transfer equation":

$$\Delta Weight_{front} = a \frac{h}{w}m$$

where $\Delta Weight_{front}$ is the change in load borne by the front wheels, $a$ is the longitudinal acceleration, $h$ is the center of mass height, $w$ is the wheelbase, and $m$ is the total vehicle mass.

An equivalent expression, which does not require knowing the load borne by the front wheels nor the total vehicle mass, is for the minimum longitudinal acceleration required for a wheelie:

$$a_{min} = g \frac{b}{h}$$

where $g$ is the acceleration due to gravity, $b$ is the horizontal distance from the rear axle to the center of mass, and $h$ is the vertical distance from the ground to the center of mass. Thus the minimum acceleration required is directly proportional to how far forward the center of mass is located and inversely proportional to how high it is located.

Since mechanical power can be defined as force times velocity, in one dimension, and force is equivalent to mass times acceleration, then the minimum power required for a wheelie can be expressed as the product of mass, velocity, and the minimum acceleration required for a wheelie:

$$P_{min} = mva_{min}$$

Thus the minimum power required is directly proportional to the mass of the vehicle and to its velocity. The slower a vehicle is moving, the less power is required to perform a wheelie, and that is without even considering the power required to overcome air drag, which increases with the cube of velocity. Therefore, the least amount of power required is when the vehicle begins accelerating from rest.

In the case of tractor and truck pulling, the force to pull the load is applied above the ground, and so it also acts to lift the front wheels and thus reduces the forward acceleration necessary to lift the front wheels.

The total power $P$ required during a wheel, neglecting air drag can be shown to be:

$$P_{T} = m [ a_{x} v_{x} + ( x_{2} \cos \theta - y_{1} \sin \theta + k^{2} ) \alpha \omega ]$$

where $m$ is vehicle with mass, $k$ is the vehicle radius of gyration, $x_{2}$ and $y_{1}$ are distance from rear wheel contact patch to center of mass, $a_{x}$ is horizontal acceleration, $v_{x}$ is horizontal velocity, $\theta$ is angle of vehicle from horizontal, $\omega$ is angular velocity of vehicle rotation, and $\alpha$ is angular acceleration of vehicle rotation. This can be separated into components necessary only for horizontal acceleration

$$P_{H} =  m a_{x} v_{x}$$

and components necessary only for raising and rotating the vehicle

$$P_{R} = m ( x_{2}\cos\theta - y_{1}\sin\theta + k^{2} ) \alpha \omega$$

A factor M can be calculated as the ratio of the power required to raise and rotate the vehicle and the power required only for horizontal acceleration.

$$M_{} = \frac{P_{R}}{P_{H}} = \frac{ ( x_{2}\cos\theta - y_{1}\sin\theta + k^{2} ) \alpha \omega }{ a_{x} v_{x} }$$

== Gallery ==
Motorcycle performing a wheelie (video)

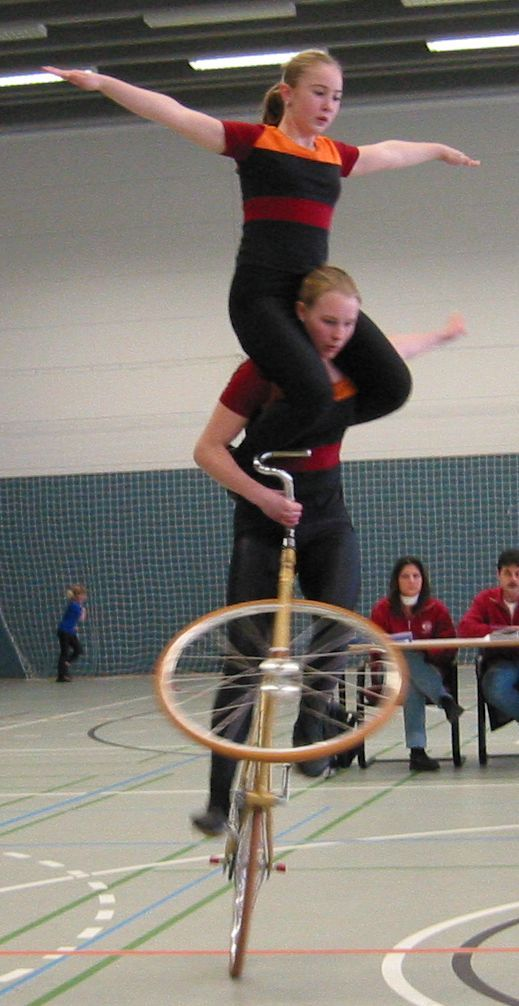
A wheelie as part of an artistic cycling routine

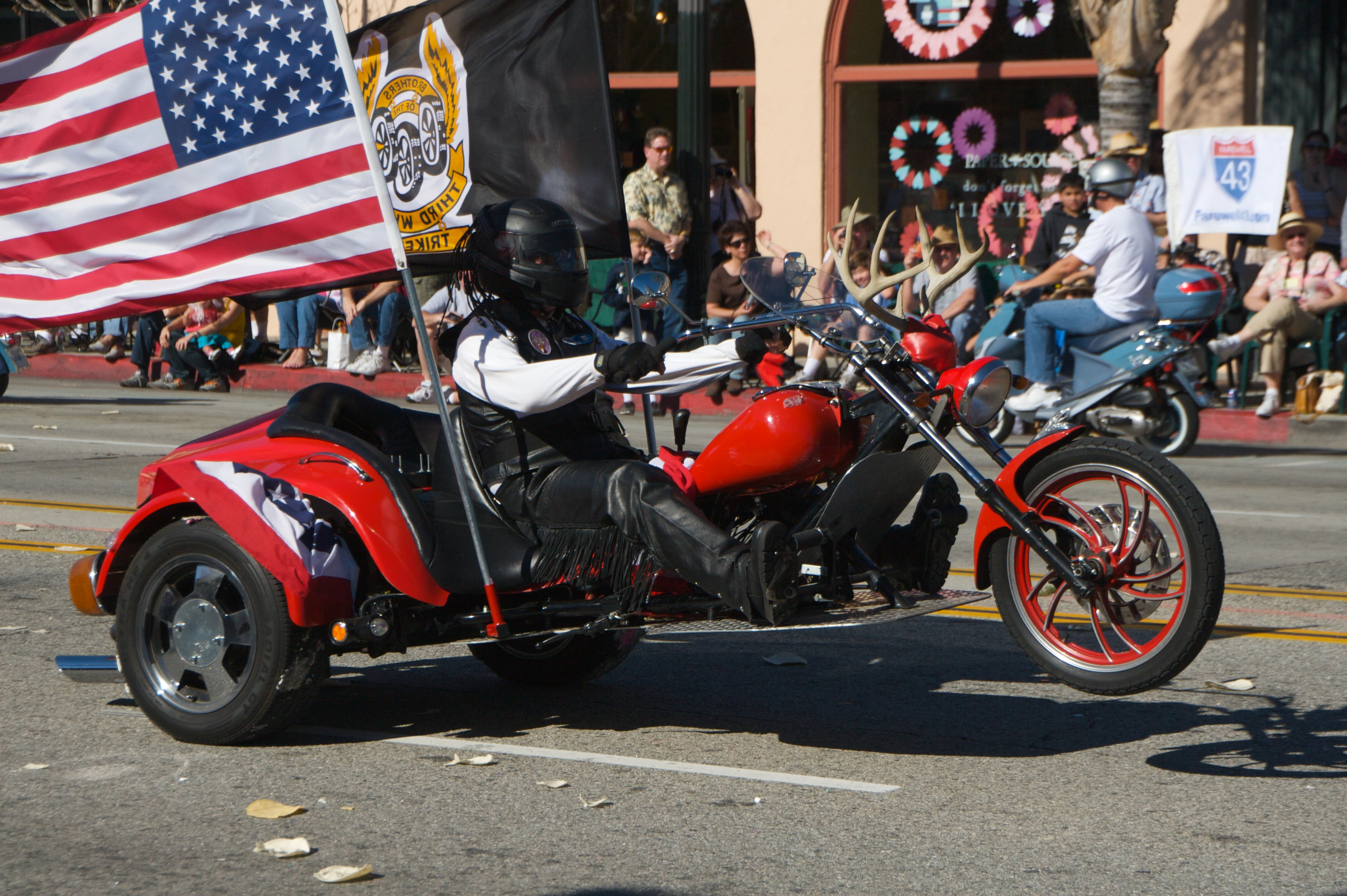
Tricycle performing a wheelie

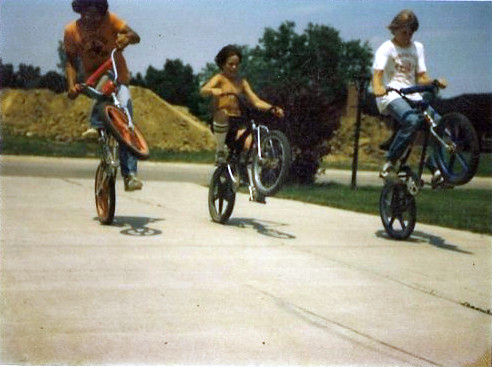
Wheelies by seated and standing cyclists

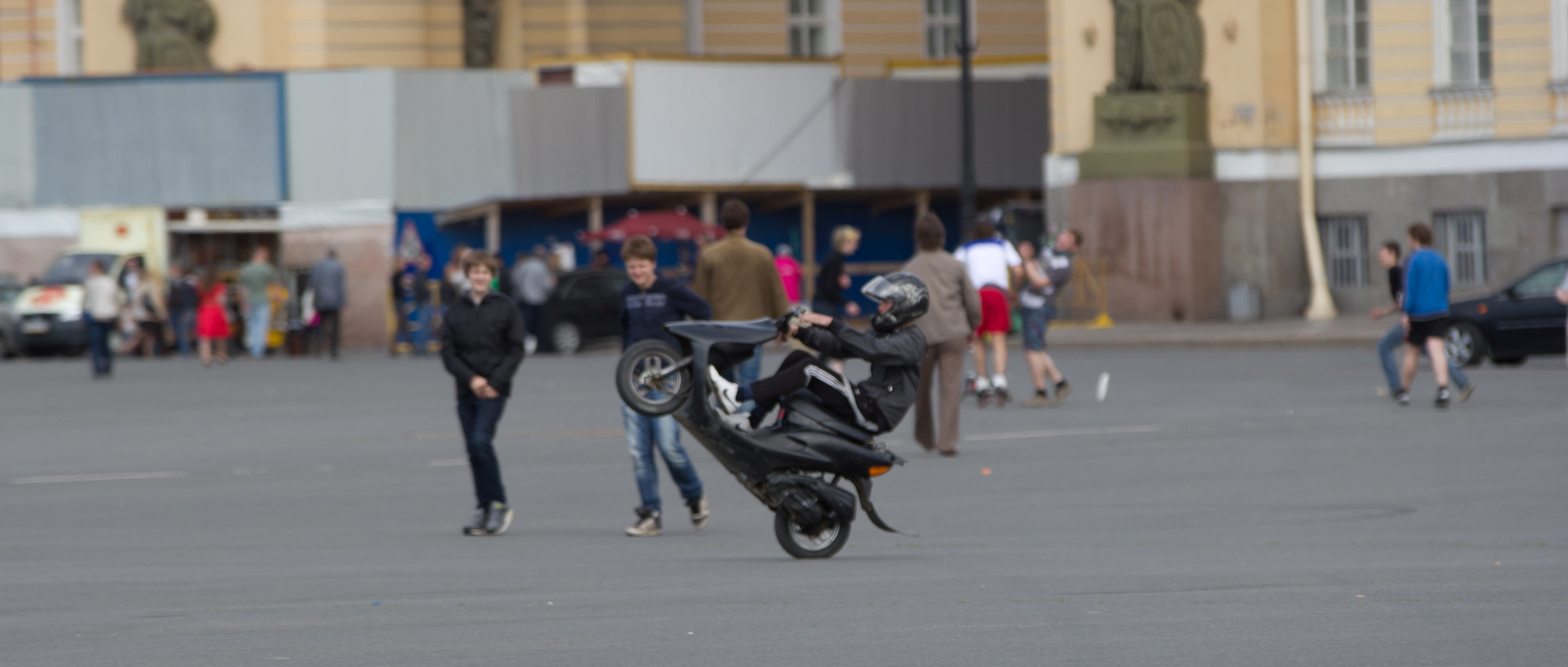
Motor scooter performing a wheelie

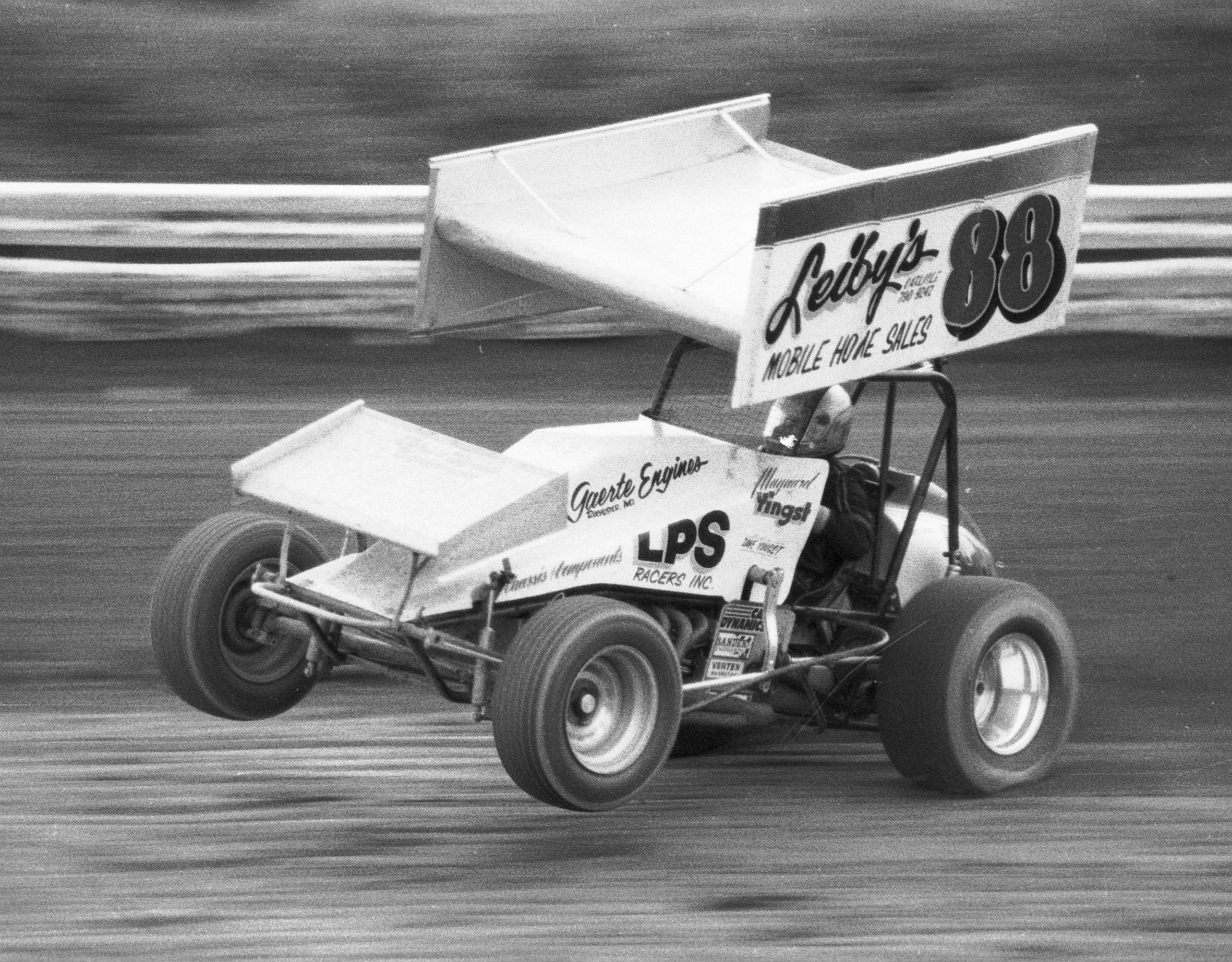
Sprint car performing a wheelie

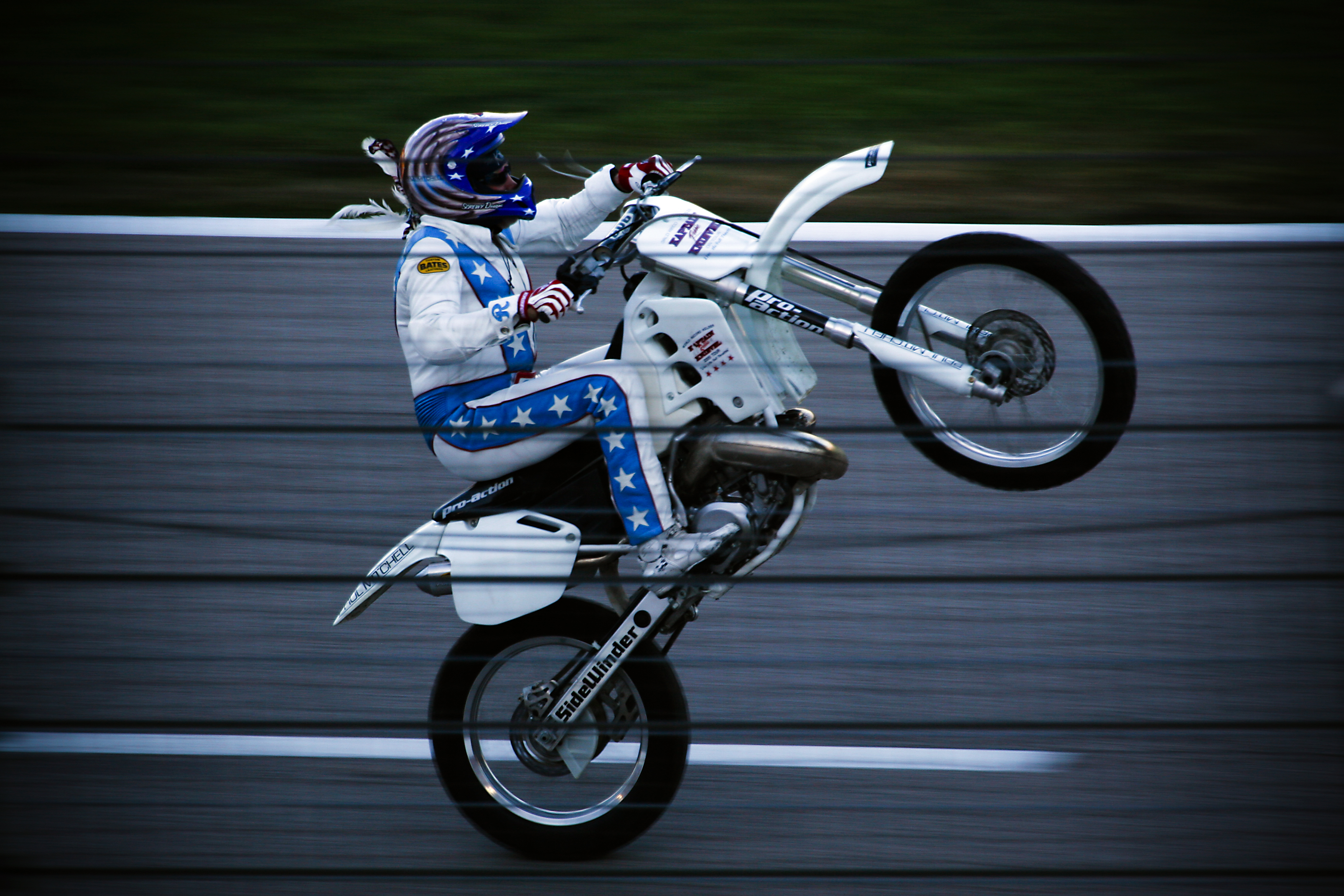
Robbie Knievel performing a wheelie

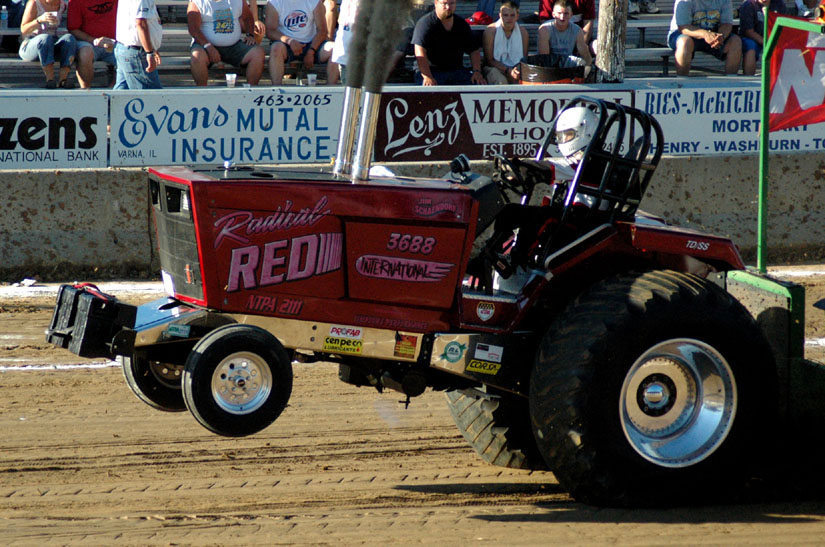
Tractor performing a wheelie

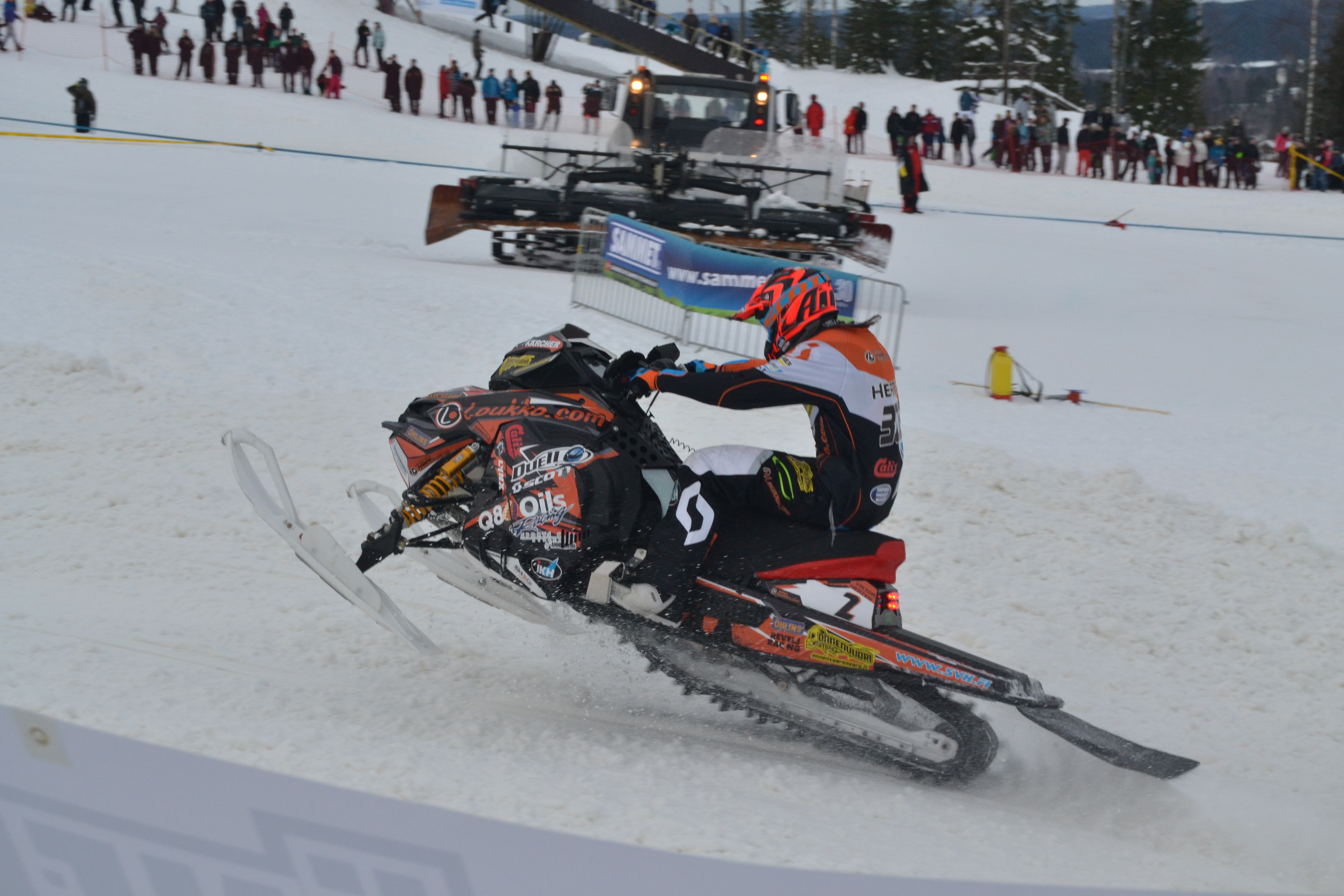
Snowmobile performing a wheelie

== See also ==
- Bicycle and motorcycle dynamics
- Ski (driving stunt)
- Stoppie
- Weight transfer
