= Racing setup =

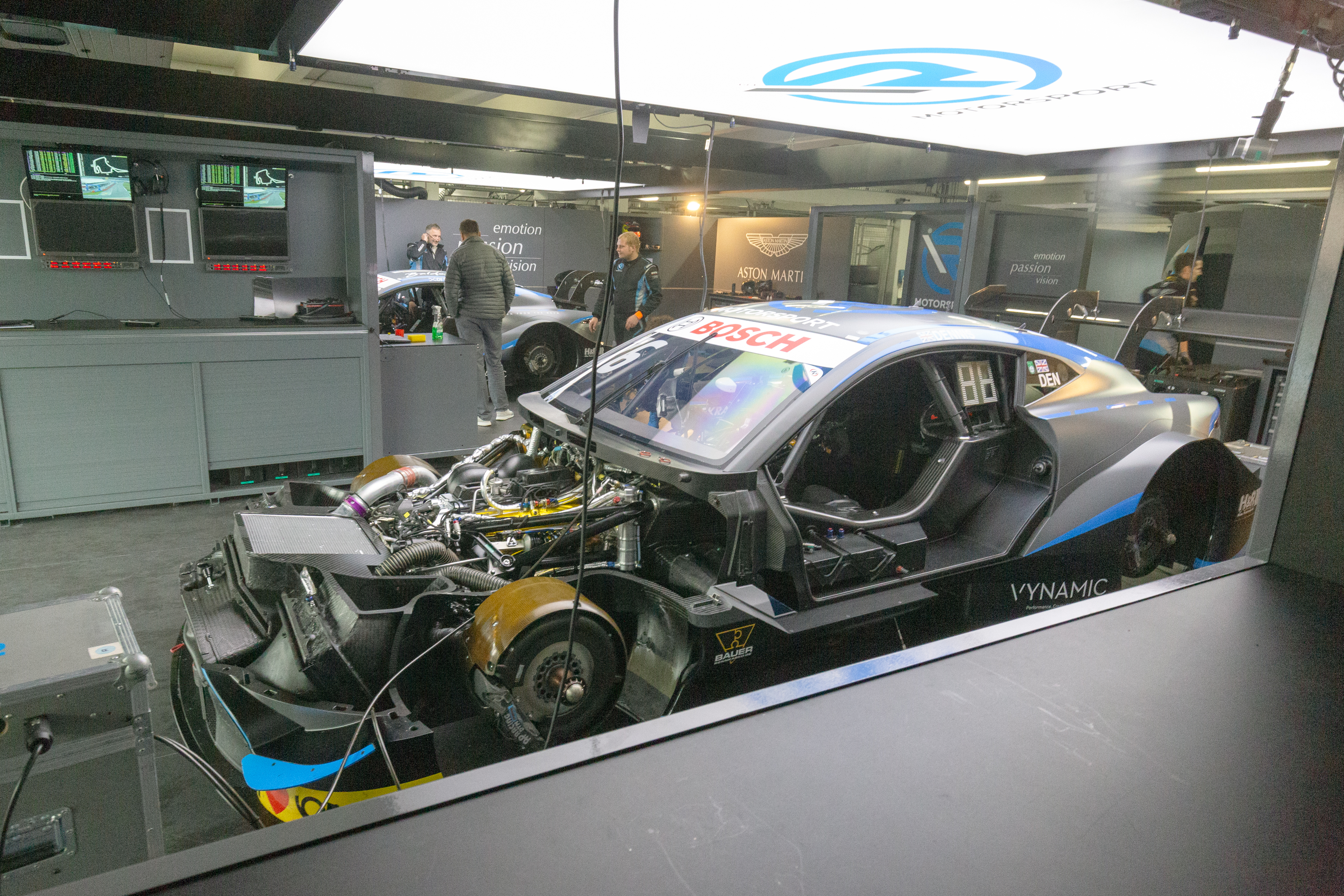
DTM vehicle with the wheels taken off for adjusting the racing setup

In motorsport, the racing setup, car setup or vehicle setup is the set of adjustments made to the vehicle in order to optimize its behaviour (performance, handling, reliability, etc.) for specific conditions. Vehicle setups are variable for a variety of reasons, ranging from weather, driver/rider preference and race track characteristics. Contrary to common misperceptions, setup is not used to maximize the performance of the engine, but to optimize it for the track at which it is being used. For example, motorcycle racers frequently detune their engines to reduce performance and power output so as to ensure the bike accelerates in a predictable manner.

Adjustable vehicle parts usually include shock absorbers and anti-roll bar (suspension), gear ratios and differential, tyre pressures and type, wing angles, wheel toe and camber angle, brake bias, steering lock and ride height.

== Modifications and adjustments to affect handling ==
The following trends will apply in most cases, but there can be exceptions to some of these. Changes should generally be made one at a time, in small steps. Adjusting to gain in one characteristic will often be at the expense of another characteristic.

Component	Reduce understeer	Reduce oversteer
Weight distribution	centre of gravity towards rear	centre of gravity towards front
Front shock absorber	softer	stiffer
Rear shock absorber	stiffer	softer
Front sway bar	softer	stiffer
Rear sway bar	stiffer	softer
Front tyre selection^{1}	larger contact area²	smaller contact area
Rear tyre selection	smaller contact area	larger contact area²
Front wheel rim width or diameter (will change the tyre shape but not area)	larger²	smaller
Rear wheel rim width or diameter (will change tyre shape, but not area)	smaller	larger²
Front tyre pressure*	lower pressure	higher pressure
Rear tyre pressure*	higher pressure	lower pressure
Front wheel camber	increase negative camber	reduce negative camber
Rear wheel camber	reduce negative camber	increase negative camber
Rear spoiler	smaller	larger
Front height (because these usually affect camber and roll resistance, see also body roll; not to be confused with rolling friction)	lower front end	raise front end
Rear height	raise rear end	lower rear end
Front toe in	decrease	increase
Rear toe in	decrease	increase
1) Tyre contact area can be increased by using wider tyres, or tyres with fewer grooves in the tread pattern. Fewer grooves has the opposite effect in wet weather or other poor road conditions. 2) These also improve roadholding, under most conditions. * Every tyre has its "optimum" pressure at which it makes the most grip. Above this grip slowly drops and below this it drops quickly. It is recommended for the driver to keep this in mind because dropping pressure improves that end of the car and adding pressure lowers it.

In addition, lowering the centre of gravity will always help the handling (as well as reduce the chance of roll-over). This can be done to some extent by using plastic windows (or none) and a light roof, hood (bonnet) and boot (trunk) lid materials, by reducing the ground clearance, etc. Increasing the track with "reversed" wheels will have a similar effect. However, the wider the car, the less spare room it has on the road and the further the driver may have to swerve to miss an obstacle. Stiffer springs and/or shocks, both front and rear, will generally improve handling, at the expense of comfort on small bumps. Performance suspension kits are available. Light alloy (mostly aluminium or magnesium) wheels improve handling, ride and appearance.

The car's roll centre is the other fundamental piece of the equation. Care must be taken to avoid lowering the centre of gravity past the car's roll centre. The distance between the car's centre of gravity and its roll centre is known as the roll couple, or the length that the car rolls around. Ideally, if the roll centre and the centre of gravity occupy the same space, the car should exhibit zero body roll.

Moment of inertia can be reduced by decreasing weight, which usually results from using lighter bumpers and wings (fenders), or none at all.

== See also ==
- Car handling
- Car tuning, the hobby of modifying a car
- Coil bind
- Oversteer
- Understeer
- Vehicle dynamics
- Inerter (mechanical networks)
