= Twist-beam rear suspension =

Type of automobile suspension

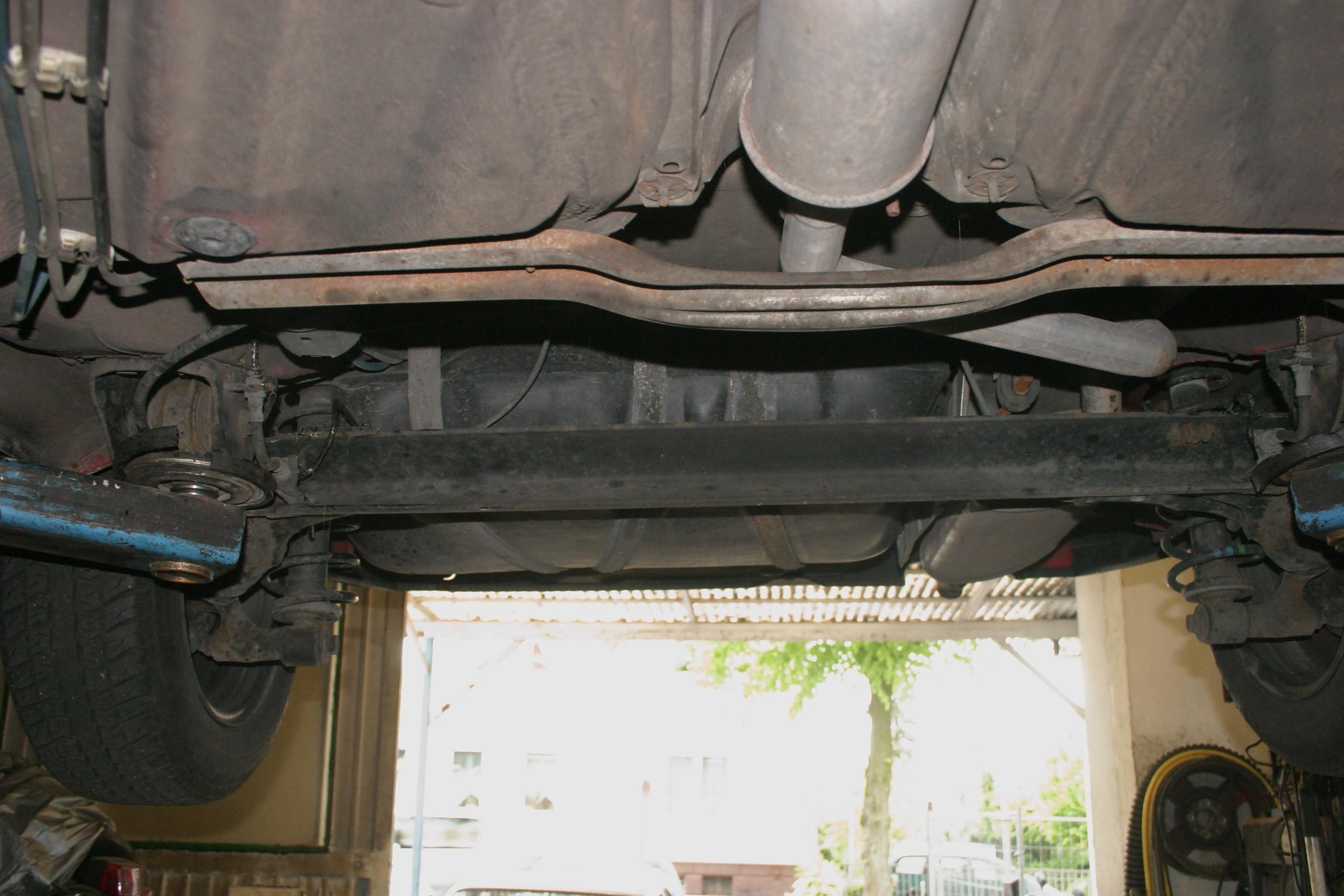
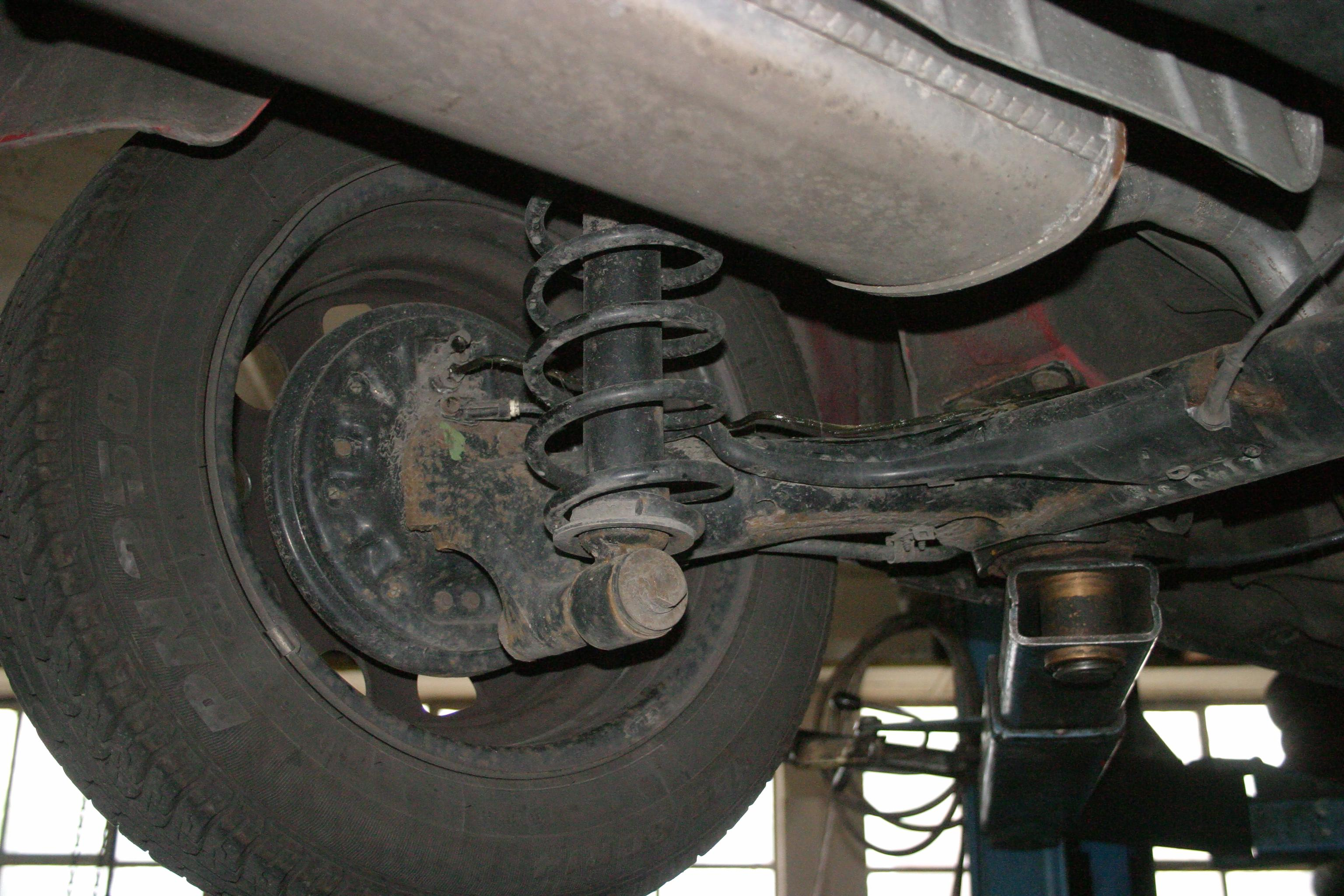
Twist-beam rear suspension of a Volkswagen Golf Mk3

The twist-beam rear suspension (also torsion-beam axle, deformable torsion beam, or compound crank) is a type of automobile suspension based on a large H- or C-shaped member. The front of the H attaches to the body via rubber bushings, and the rear of the H carries each stub-axle assembly, on each side of the car. The cross beam of the H holds the two trailing arms together, and provides the roll stiffness of the suspension, by twisting as the two trailing arms move vertically, relative to each other.

== Functioning ==
The coil springs usually bear on a pad alongside the stub-axle. Often, the shock is collinear with the spring forming a coil-over. In many cases, the damper is also used as a restraint strap to stop the arm descending so far that the coil spring falls out through being completely unloaded. This location gives a high motion ratio compared with most suspensions, improving performance.

The longitudinal location of the cross beam controls important parameters of the suspension's behavior, such as the roll steer curve and toe and camber compliance. The closer the cross beam to the axle stubs, the more the camber and toe change under deflection. A key difference between the camber and toe changes of a twist beam versus a traditional independent suspension is the change in camber and toe is dependent on the position of the other wheel, not the car's chassis. In a traditional independent suspension, the camber and toe are based on the position of the wheel relative to the body. With twist-beam, if both wheels compress together, their camber and toe will not change. Thus, if both wheels started perpendicular to the road and are compressed together, they will stay perpendicular to the road. The camber and toe changes are the result of one wheel being compressed relative to the other.

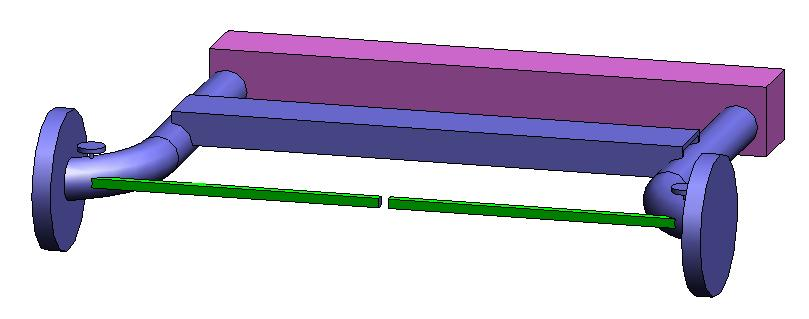
Conceptual model of a twist-beam suspension. The green segments illustrate the axle stub centerlines. At rest, the axles are in line and the wheels are vertical (Camber = 0 degrees)

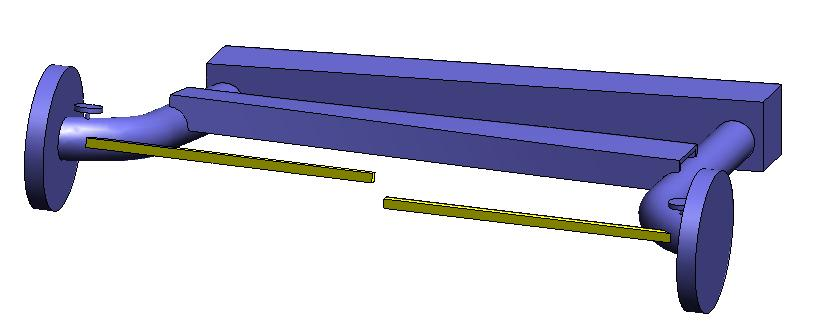
The twist-beam suspension with the left axle deflected upwards. The deflected wheel now has negative camber. The left and right axles are no longer aligned. The right wheel's camber becomes positive from the deflection of the left wheel.

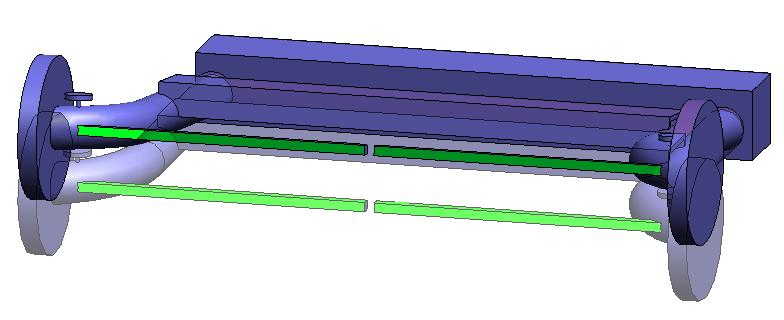
Both wheels shown deflected up (bump) and at rest. Note that the axle halves remain in line and the wheel camber does not change.

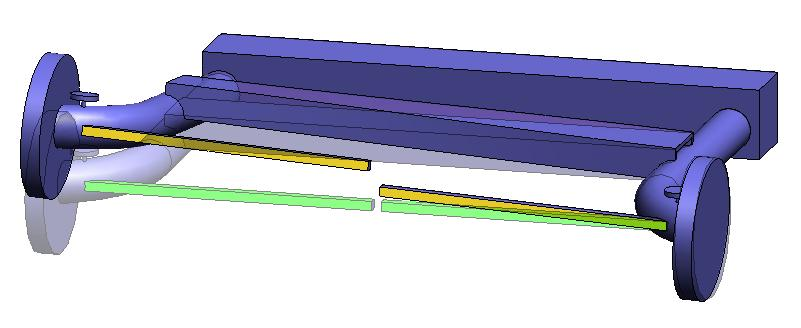
Single wheel deflection shown versus both wheels at rest.

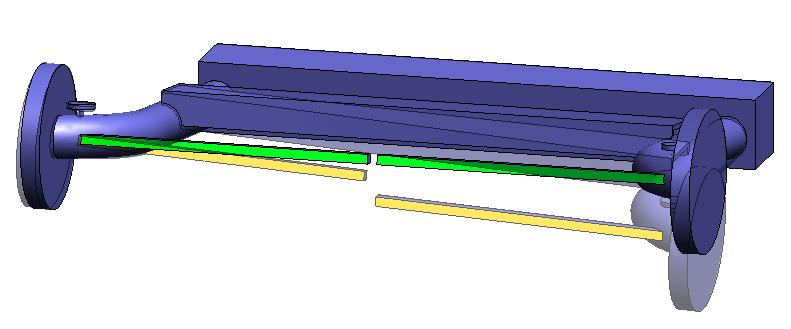
Single wheel deflection (deflection due to roll) versus both wheels up (deflection in bump). Note that when both wheels are deflected, the axles remain in line and the wheels have no camber change.

== Uses ==
This suspension is commonly used on a wide variety of front-wheel-drive cars (mainly compacts and subcompacts), and was almost ubiquitous on European superminis. When Volkswagen changed from rear-engined RR layout cars to front-wheel-drive FF layout cars in the mid-1970s, it adopted the system across not just its Audi 50/Volkswagen Polo supermini, but also the compact-hatchback Volkswagen Golf and Scirocco models.

This type of suspension is usually described as semi-independent, meaning that the two wheels can move relative to each other, but their motion is still somewhat inter-linked, to a greater extent than in a true independent rear suspension (IRS). This can mildly compromise the handling and ride quality of the vehicle. For this reason, some manufacturers have changed to different linkage designs. As an example, in 2004, Volkswagen dropped the twist-beam in favor of a true IRS for the Volkswagen Golf Mk5, possibly in response to its rival, the Ford Focus's "Control Blade" multi-link rear suspension introduced in 1999 – a first use of multi-link suspension in the segment. It came back on a twist-beam later for small-engine equipped variants of the Mk6 and Mk7 Golf.

General Motors in Europe (Vauxhall and Opel) continued to use twist- or torsion-beam suspension up to the end of GM's ownership of the brand, and it was used on the 1982–1988 Cadillac Cimarron, Oldsmobile Firenza, and Buick Skyhawk. The twist-beam provided a cost saving of €100 per car compared to multi-link rear suspension, although the version used in the 2009–2018 Opel Astra also employed a Watts linkage at a cost of €20 to address the drawbacks and provide a competitive and cost-effective rear suspension.

Other competitors, the Renault Mégane, Peugeot 308, and Citroen C4 also have stayed with the twist beam. The sportiest models of its brands, such as the Renault Mégane RS and the Peugeot 308 II GTi, have proven that twist-beam rear suspension can provide a high level of performance on a compact car, on the racetrack, but also during the Moose test. The Peugeot 308 II was able to outperform its competitors equipped with multi-link rear axles by passing this test at 82 km/h.

Kia Soul is also using twist-beam, although the larger Hyundai Elantra (HD) and Hyundai i30 models employed either a torsion beam or a true multi-link independent rear suspension depending on market and also trim level. Most i30 models produced in the Czech Republic have true multi-link independent rear suspension, while those produced in South Korea have torsion-beam rear suspension.

The fourth-generation Ford Focus has three rear suspension setups; most hatchback and saloon models have torsion-beam depending on market, while all wagon models have multi-link rear suspension.

== Advantages ==
- Low cost
- Very durable
- Fewer bushings than multi-link suspension, and bushings are less prone to stress and wear
- Simple
- Reduces clutter under floor
- Fairly lightweight
- Springs and shock absorbers can have low cost and can be lightweight
- May not need a separate anti-roll bar, as the axle itself may be made to perform that function (up to a point)
- Road handling can be excellent, although to the detriment of comfort (examples: Honda Civic Type R FK2, Suzuki Swift Sport, Renault Clio III RS, Peugeot 308 II GTi)

== Disadvantages ==
- Basic toe vs. lateral force characteristic is oversteer
- Since toe characteristics may be unsuitable, adding toe-control bushings may be expensive
- Camber characteristics are very limited
- Not very easy to reduce roll stiffness, but increasing it is easily done by adding an anti-roll bar
- Welds see a lot of fatigue, may need a lot of development
- Not much recession compliance: can be poor for impact harshness, and will cause unwelcome toe changes (steer effects)
- Wheel moves forward as it rises; can also be poor for impact harshness (this can be negated by designing the beam with the mounts higher than the stub axles, which impacts on the floorpan height, and causes more roll oversteer)
- Need to package room for exhaust and so on past the cross beam
- Camber compliance may be high
- No redress for wheel alignment. Alignment geometry is factory-set and not generally adjustable. Any deviation from factory specifications/tolerances could mean a bent axle or compromised mounting points.
