= Multi-link suspension =

Type of vehicle suspension

5-link rear suspension

Rear view

Top view

A multi-link suspension is a type of independent vehicle suspension having three or more control links per wheel. These links or arms do not have to be of equal length, and may be angled away from their "obvious" direction. It was introduced in the late 1960s by Mercedes-Benz on the experimental C111 then first used in production vehicles in the first half of the 1980s, on the company’s W201 sedan and later W124 series.

Typically each arm has a spherical joint (ball joint) or rubber bushing at each end. Consequently, they react to loads along their own length, in tension and compression, but not in bending. Some multi-links do use a trailing arm, control arm or wishbone, which has two bushings at one end.

On a front suspension one of the lateral arms is replaced by the tie-rod, which connects the rack or steering box to the wheel hub.

== Layout ==
In order to simplify understanding, it is usual to consider the function of the arms in each of three orthogonal planes:

- Top view:

The arms have to control toe/steer and lateral compliance. This needs a pair of arms longitudinally separated.

- Front view:

The arms have to control camber, particularly the way that the camber changes as the wheel moves up (into jounce, or bump) and down into rebound or droop.

- Side view:

The arms have to transmit traction and braking loads, usually accomplished via a longitudinal link. They also have to control caster. Note that brake torques also have to be reacted - either by a second longitudinal link, or by rotating the hub, which forces the lateral arms out of plane, so allowing them to react 'spin' forces, or by rigidly fixing the longitudinal link to the hub.

== Advantages ==
Multi-link suspension allows the auto designer the ability to incorporate both good ride and good handling in the same vehicle.

In its simplest form, the multi-link suspension is orthogonal—i.e., it is possible to alter one parameter in the suspension at a time without affecting anything else. This is in direct contrast to a double wishbone suspension, where moving a hardpoint or changing a bushing compliance will affect two or more parameters.

The benefit of the triangulated and double-triangulated arrangement is that they do not need a Panhard rod. The benefits of this are increased articulation and potential ease of installation.

== Disadvantages ==
Multilink suspension is costly and complex. It is also difficult to tune the geometry without a full 3D computer aided design analysis. Compliance under load can have an important effect and must be checked using a multibody simulation software.

== Gallery ==
5-link rear wheel suspension mechanism (front view)

5-link rear wheel suspension mechanism (top view)

5-link suspension mechanism with rack-and-pinion steering input (front view)

5-link suspension mechanism with rack-and-pinion steering input (top view)

== See also ==
- Automotive suspension design
