= Bundorf analysis =

A Bundorf analysis is a measure of the characteristics of a vehicle that govern its understeer balance. The understeer is measured in units of degrees of additional yaw per g of lateral acceleration.

== An imaginary example ==
	Front	Rear
	deg/g	deg/g
Load transfer effect and cornering stiffness of tire	8.0	7.0
Aligning torque	0.2	-0.2
Roll camber	1.2	0.0
Roll steer	0.6	-0.4
Fy Compliance steer	0.3	-0.1
SAT compliance steer	0.7	0.6
Total Axle Cornering compliance	11.0	6.9

Hence the total under-steer is 11.0 deg/g minus 6.9 deg/g, or 4.1 deg/g.

Negative values are over-steering, positive values are under-steering, for that axle. If the under-steer contribution of the rear axle is greater than that of the front axle you get negative under-steer, which is known as oversteer. The analysis is only applicable while the parameters remain constant, and thus only up to about 0.4 g.

== Explanation of terms ==
Load transfer effect and cornering stiffness of tire. As load transfers across the vehicle the tire's ability to provide cornering force for a given slip angle changes. The latter is known as the cornering stiffness of the tire. See also Tire load sensitivity

Aligning torque. The tire does not just generate a lateral force, it generates a torque as well. This tends to rotate the vehicle as a whole.

Roll camber. As the vehicle rolls the kinematics of the suspension provide a change in the camber of the tire. This generates a force known as camber thrust.

Roll steer. As the vehicle rolls the kinematics of the suspension provide a change in the steer angle of the tire. This generates a cornering force in the normal way.

Fy compliance steer. The lateral force at the contact patch causes the wheel to rotate about the steer axis, generating a steer angle.

SAT compliance steer. The aligning torque directly twists the wheel on the compliances in the suspension, generating a steer angle.

Under-steer. In this case, the tendency for an axle or vehicle to turn outwards from a corner.

== See also ==
- Vehicle dynamics
