= Ground pressure =

Pressure exerted on the ground by the tires or tracks of a motorized vehicle

Ground pressure is the pressure exerted on the ground by the tires or tracks of a motorized vehicle, and is one measure of its potential mobility, especially over soft ground. It also applies to the feet of a walking person or machine. Pressure is measured in the SI unit of pascals (Pa). Average ground pressure can be calculated using the standard formula for average pressure: P = F/A. In an idealised case, i.e. a static, uniform net force normal to level ground, this is simply the object's weight divided by contact area. The ground pressure of motorized vehicles is often compared with the ground pressure of a human foot, which can be 60 – 80 kPa while walking or as much as 13 MPa for a person in spike heels.

Increasing the size of the contact area on the ground (the footprint) in relation to the weight decreases the unit ground pressure. Ground pressure of 14 kPa (2 psi) or less is recommended for fragile ecosystems like marshes. Decreasing the ground pressure increases the flotation, allowing easier passage of the body over soft terrain. This is exemplified by use of equipment such as snowshoes.

== Examples ==
All examples are approximate, and will vary based on conditions

Object	Ground pressure (kPa)	(psi)
Hovercraft	0.7	0.1
Human on snowshoes	3.5	0.5
Rubber-tracked ATV	5.165	0.75
Wheeled ATV	13.8	2
Diedrich D-50 – T2 drilling rig	26.2	3.8
Human male (130 kg, standing on one foot)	55	8
Average human, flat shoes	17	2.5
M1 Abrams tank	103	15
1993 Toyota 4Runner / Hilux Surf	170	25
Adult horse (550 kg, 1250 lb)	170	25
Bagger 288 excavation machine	170	25
Passenger car	205	30
Adult elephant	240	35
Mountain bicycle	245	40
Road racing bicycle	620	90
Commercial semi truck/Lorry	793	115
Stiletto heel	3,250	471

Note: The pressures for average human and horse are for standing still position. A walking human will exert more than double his standing pressure. A galloping horse will exert up to 3.5 MPa (500 psi). The ground pressure for a pneumatic tire is roughly equal to its inflation pressure.

== See also ==
- Contact patch
- Tire load sensitivity

== Related reading ==
- Theory of Ground Vehicles
