= Road-holding =

Road-holding – also written as roadholding and road holding – (in French being called "tenue de route", in German "Beibehaltung der Spur"), is essentially determined by the ability of a vehicle to stay on the road and on a desired trajectory of motion, whatever the circumstances (in curves, on greasy, wet or low-grip ground, loaded or not, etc.) may be, but also by the degree of ease that a driver may sense in controlling it in an emergency situation. (Hereby, the laws of nature as a framework, including the gravitational field of the planet Earth as well as the phenomenon of inertia, are tacitly assumed as given.)

In the above context, the straight-line stability of a vehicle – which is concomitant with its ability to stay on a desired trajectory of motion – necessitates a certain degree of understeering.

The capability to smooth down the road imperfections, affects both the comfort and the road-holding of a vehicle. To improve comfort in this regard means, basically, to limit the vertical acceleration fluctuations of the vehicle body and hence of passengers. To improve road-holding means, among other things, to limit the fluctuations of the vertical force that each tire exchanges with the road. Therefore, modeling and simulation using realistic suspension-damping models, taking the vehicle tires into account, offer a straightforward opportunity for road-holding improvement of vehicles. Optimization techniques for this purpose are also known. The application of inerters is a very new possibility in this regard, although this technology is more destined to race cars than to ordinary vehicle applications.

As a more sophisticated means for improving road-holding, active suspension – involving sensors, actuators and microcontrollers – may also serve.

For vehicle speeds above approximately 40 meters per second, the effects of aerodynamic forces at an automobile (that is not designed in a too odd manner) tend to become sensible for its road-holding.

Beyond what has been previously mentioned, electronic stability control, if being present on a vehicle and properly tuned, will have a stabilizing influence on the trajectory of motion and accordingly an improving effect on road-holding of that vehicle.

== See also ==
- Automobile handling
- Cornering force
- Directional stability
- Grip (auto racing)
- Traction (engineering)
