= Roll moment =

Physics concept

Roll moment is a moment, which is a product of a force and a distance, that tends to cause a vehicle to roll, that is to rotate about its longitudinal axis.

== Landcraft ==
In vehicle dynamics, the roll moment can be calculated as the product of three quantities:

1. the vehicle's sprung mass, the portion of its mass supported by the suspension,
2. whatever lateral acceleration that the vehicle is experiencing, usually centripetal acceleration from a turn, and
3. the vertical distance between the vehicle's roll axis and its center of mass.

In two-axle vehicles, such as cars and some trucks, the roll axis may be found by connecting the roll center of each axle by a straight line. In single-track vehicles, such as bicycles and motorcycles, the roll axis may be found by connecting the contact patches of each tire by a straight line.

== Aircraft ==
In aeronautics, the roll moment is the product of an aerodynamic force and the distance between where it is applied and the aircraft's center of mass that tends to cause the aircraft to rotate about its roll axis. The roll axis is usually defined as the longitudinal axis, which runs from the nose to the tail of the aircraft. A roll moment can be the result of wind gusts, control surfaces such as ailerons, or simply by flying at an angle of sideslip. See flight dynamics.

== Watercraft ==
In watercraft, roll is the rotation around the ships longitudinal (front-back or bow-stern) axis. Heel refers to an offset from normal on this axis that is intentional or expected, as caused by wind pressure on sails, turning, or other crew actions. List refers to an unintentional or unexpected offset, as caused by flooding, battle damage, shifting cargo, etc.
