= Steering ratio =

Ratio in automotive engineering

Steering ratio refers to the ratio between the turn of the steering wheel (in degrees) or handlebars and the turn of the wheels (in degrees).

The steering ratio is the ratio of the number of degrees of turn of the steering wheel to the number of degrees the wheel(s) turn as a result. In motorcycles, delta tricycles and bicycles, the steering ratio is always 1:1, because the steering wheel is fixed to the front wheel. A steering ratio of x:y means that a turn of the steering wheel x degree(s) causes the wheel(s) to turn y degree(s). In most passenger cars, the ratio is between 12:1 and 20:1. For example, if one and a half turns of the steering wheel, 540 degrees, causes the inner & outer wheel to turn 35 and 30 degrees respectively, due to Ackermann steering geometry, the ratio is then 540:((35+30)/2) = 16.6:1.

A higher steering ratio means that the steering wheel is turned more to get the wheels turning, but it will be easier to turn the steering wheel. A lower steering ratio means that the steering wheel is turned less to get the wheels turning, but it will be harder to turn the steering wheel. Larger and heavier vehicles will often have a higher steering ratio, which will make the steering wheel easier to turn. If a truck had a low steering ratio, it would be very hard to turn the steering wheel. In normal and lighter cars, the wheels are easier to turn, so the steering ratio doesn't have to be as high. In race cars the ratio is typically very low, because the vehicle must respond to steering input much faster than in normal cars. The steering wheel is therefore harder to turn.

== Variable-ratio steering ==
Variable-ratio steering is a system that uses different ratios on the rack in a rack and pinion steering system. At the center of the rack, the space between the teeth are smaller and the space becomes larger as the pinion moves down the rack. In the middle of the rack there is a higher ratio and the ratio becomes lower as the steering wheel is turned towards lock. That makes the steering less sensitive when the steering wheel is close to its center position and makes it harder for the driver to over steer at high speeds. As the steering wheel is turned towards lock, the wheels begin to react more to steering input.

== Steering quickener ==
A steering quickener is used to modify the steering ratio of factory-installed steering system, which in turn modifies the response time and overall handling of vehicle. When a steering quickener is employed in an automobile, the driver of the automobile can turn the steering wheel a smaller degree compared to a factory-installed steering system without a steering quickener, to turn the vehicle through same distance. On the other hand, the steering effort needed will greatly increase. If the automobile is equipped with power steering, overloading the power steering pump can also be a concern.
