= Tire load sensitivity =

Behaviour of tires under load

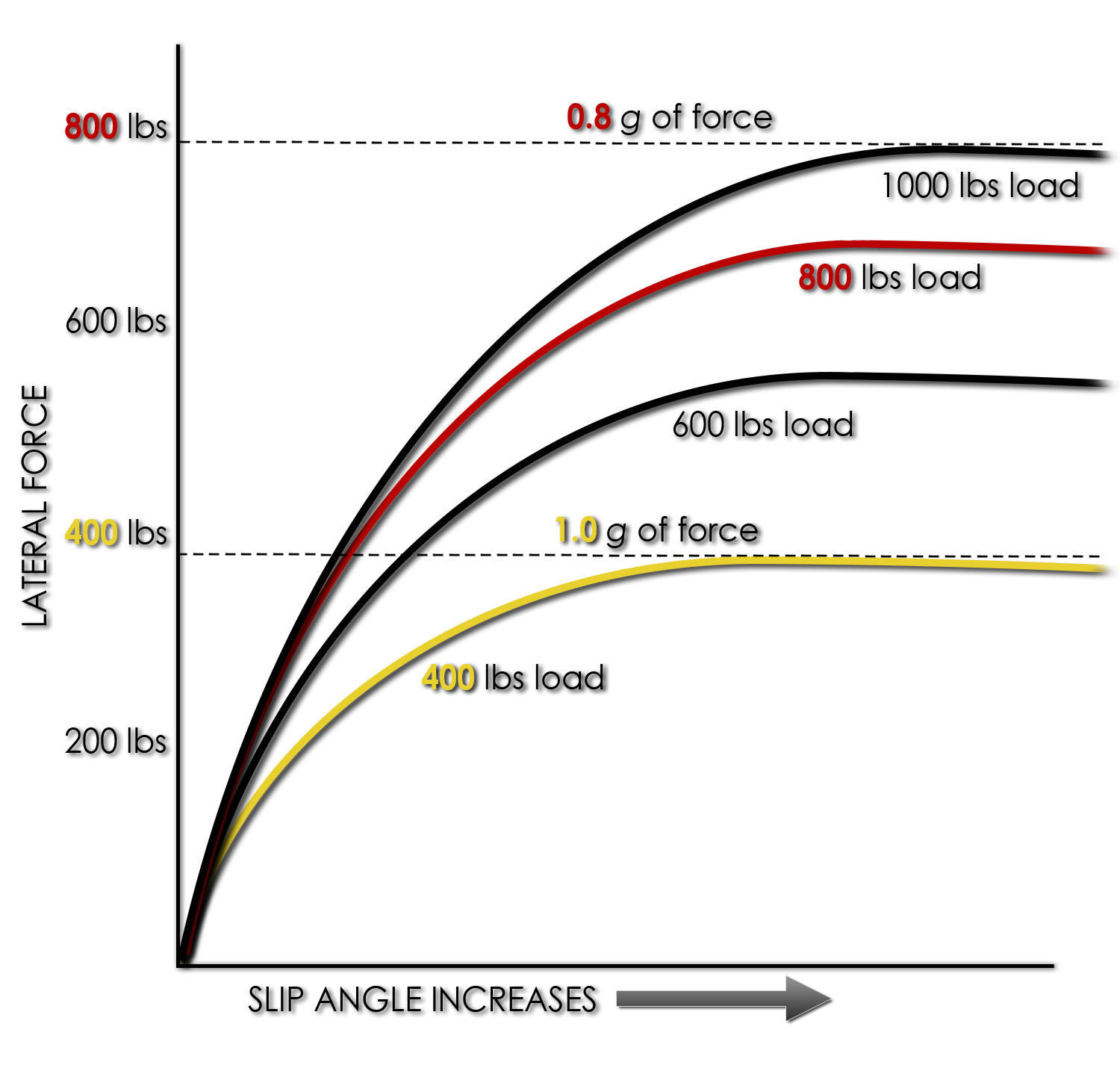
Tire load sensitivity

Tire load sensitivity describes the behaviour of tires under load. Conventional pneumatic tires do not behave as classical friction theory would suggest. The load sensitivity of most real tires in their typical operating range is such that the coefficient of friction decreases as the vertical load, Fz, increases. The maximum lateral force that can be developed does increase as the vertical load increases, but at a diminishing rate.

== Behaviour ==
Coulomb friction theory says that the maximum horizontal force developed should be proportional to the vertical load on the tire. In practice, the maximum horizontal force Fy that can be generated is proportional, roughly, to the vertical load Fz raised to the power of somewhere between 0.7 and 0.9, typically.

Production car tires typically develop this maximum lateral force, or cornering force, at a slip angle of 6-10 degrees, although this angle increases as the vertical load on the tire increases. Formula 1 car tires may reach a peak side force at 3 degrees

== Example ==
As an example, here is data extracted from Milliken and Milliken's "Race Car Vehicle Dynamics", figure 2.9:

Vertical load	Fy/Fz	Slip Angle
(lbf)	max	degrees
900	1.10	5.6
1350	1.08	6.0
1800	0.97	6.7

The same sensitivity is typically seen in the longitudinal forces, and combined lateral and longitudinal slip.

== See also ==
- Racing slick
- Weight transfer and load transfer
