= Weight transfer =

Change in wheel load or center of mass in a vehicle

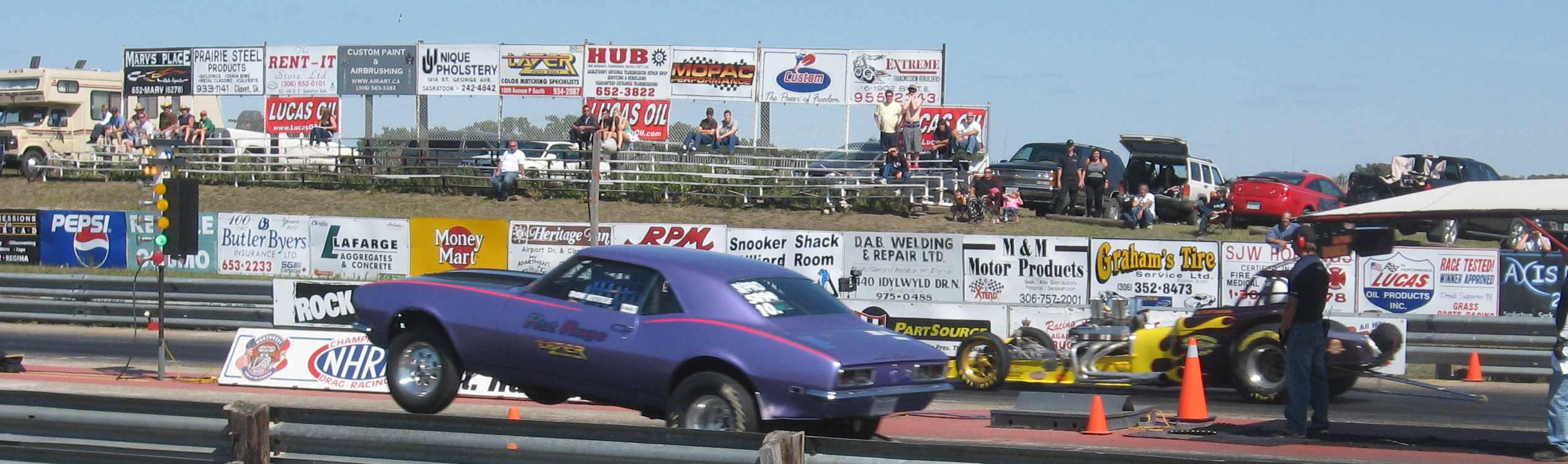
Chevrolet Camaro performing a wheelie during drag racing

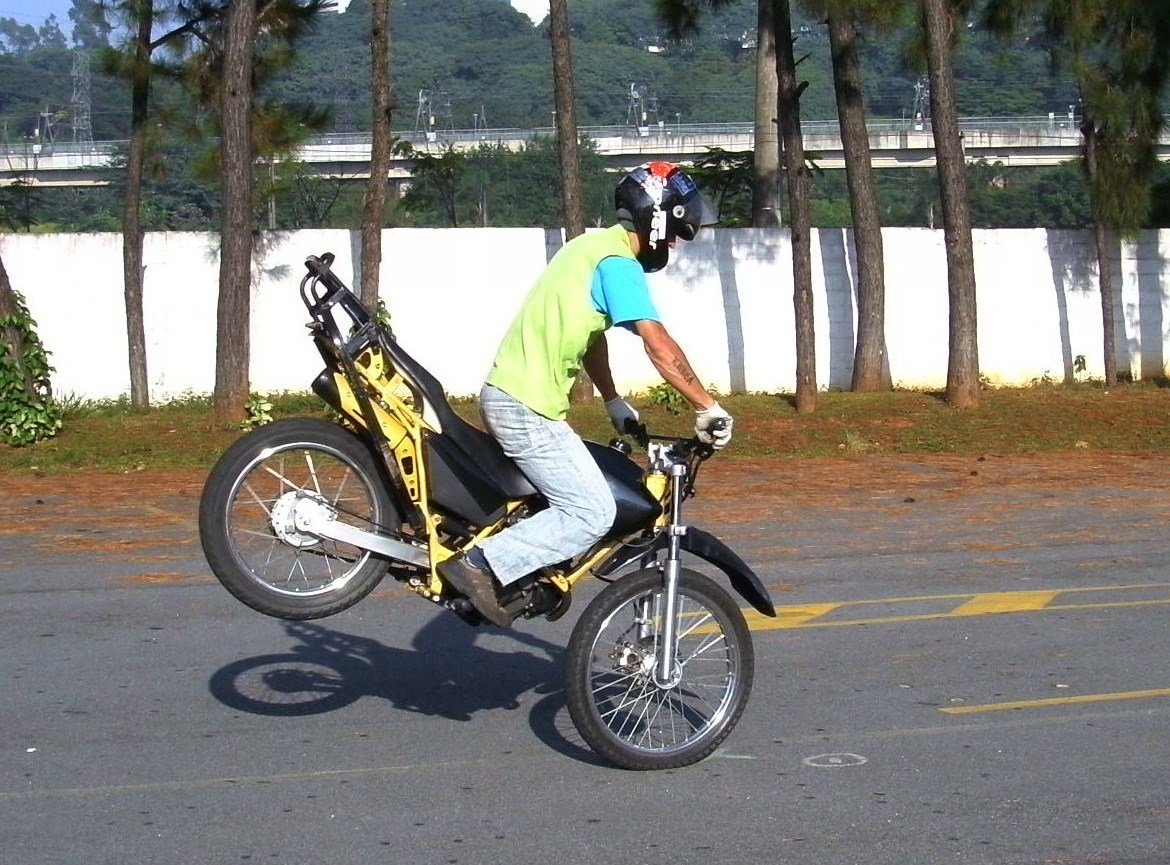
A motorcyclist performing a stoppie

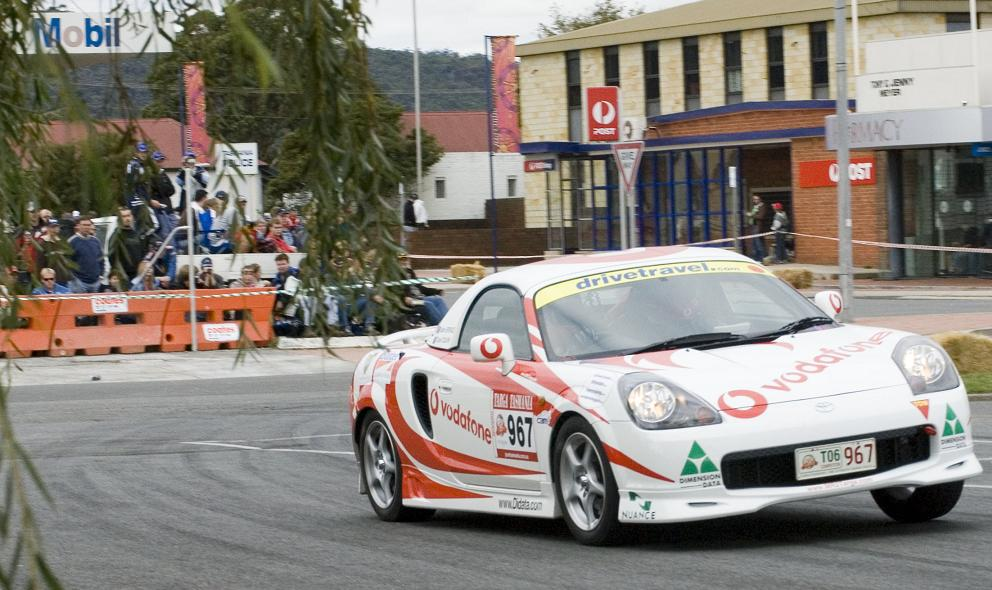
A Toyota MR2 leaning to the outside of a turn

Weight transfer and load transfer are two expressions used somewhat confusingly to describe two distinct effects in the context of automobile and motorcycle dynamics:

- the change in load borne by different wheels of even perfectly rigid vehicles during acceleration
- the change in center of mass (CoM) location relative to the wheels because of suspension compliance or cargo shifting or sloshing

In the automobile industry, weight transfer customarily refers to the change in load borne by different wheels during acceleration. This would be more properly referred to as load transfer, and that is the expression used in the motorcycle industry, while weight transfer on motorcycles, to a lesser extent on automobiles, and cargo movement on either is due to a change in the CoM location relative to the wheels. This article uses this latter pair of definitions.

== Load transfer ==
In wheeled vehicles, load transfer is the measurable change of load borne by different wheels during acceleration (both longitudinal and lateral). This includes braking, and deceleration (which is an acceleration at a negative rate). No motion of the center of mass relative to the wheels is necessary, and so load transfer may be experienced by vehicles with no suspension at all. Load transfer is a crucial concept in understanding vehicle dynamics. The same is true in bikes, though only longitudinally.

== Cause ==
The major forces that accelerate a vehicle occur at the tires' contact patches. Since these forces are not directed through the vehicle's CoM, one or more moments are generated whose forces are the tires' traction forces at pavement level, the other one (equal but opposed) is the mass inertia located at the CoM and the moment arm is the distance from pavement surface to CoM. It is these moments that cause variation in the load distributed between the tires. Often this is interpreted by the casual observer as a pitching or rolling motion of the vehicles body. A perfectly rigid vehicle, without suspension that would not exhibit pitching or rolling of the body, still undergoes load transfer. However, the pitching and rolling of the body of a non-rigid vehicle adds some (small) weight transfer due to the (small) CoM horizontal displacement with respect to the wheel's axis suspension vertical travel and also due to deformation of the tires i.e. contact patch displacement relative to wheel.

Lowering the CoM towards the ground is one method of reducing load transfer. As a result load transfer is reduced in both the longitudinal and lateral directions. Another method of reducing load transfer is by increasing the wheel spacings. Increasing the vehicle's wheelbase (length) reduces longitudinal load transfer while increasing the vehicle's track (width) reduces lateral load transfer. Most high performance automobiles are designed to sit as low as possible and usually have an extended wheelbase and track.

One way to calculate the effect of load transfer, keeping in mind that this article uses "load transfer" to mean the phenomenon commonly referred to as "weight transfer" in the automotive world, is with the so-called "weight transfer equation":

$\Delta \mathrm{Weight}_\mathrm{front} = a\frac{h}{b}m$ or $\Delta \mathrm{Weight}_\mathrm{front} = \frac{a}{g} \frac{h}{b}w$

where $\Delta \mathrm{Weight}_\mathrm{front}$ is the change in load borne by the front wheels, $a$ is the longitudinal acceleration, $g$ is the acceleration of gravity, $h$ is the center of mass height, $b$ is the wheelbase, $m$ is the total vehicle mass, and $w$ is the total vehicle weight.

Weight transfer involves the actual (relatively small) movement of the vehicle CoM relative to the wheel axes due to displacement of the chassis as the suspension complies, or of cargo or liquids within the vehicle, which results in a redistribution of the total vehicle load between the individual tires.

== Center of mass ==
Weight transfer occurs as the vehicle's CoM shifts during automotive maneuvers. Acceleration causes the sprung mass to rotate about a geometric axis resulting in relocation of the CoM. Front-back weight transfer is proportional to the change in the longitudinal location of the CoM to the vehicle's wheelbase, and side-to-side weight transfer (summed over front and rear) is proportional to the ratio of the change in the CoM's lateral location to the vehicle's track.

Liquids, such as fuel, readily flow within their containers, causing changes in the vehicle's CoM. As fuel is consumed, not only does the position of the CoM change, but the total weight of the vehicle is also reduced.

By way of example, when a vehicle accelerates, a weight transfer toward the rear wheels can occur. An outside observer might witness this as the vehicle visibly leans to the back, or squats. Conversely, under braking, weight transfer toward the front of the car can occur. Under hard braking it might be clearly visible even from inside the vehicle as the nose dives toward the ground (most of this will be due to load transfer). Similarly, during changes in direction (lateral acceleration), weight transfer to the outside of the direction of the turn can occur.

Weight transfer is generally of far less practical importance than load transfer, for cars and SUVs at least. For instance in a 0.9g turn, a car with a track of 1650 mm and a CoM height of 550 mm will see a load transfer of 30% of the vehicle weight, that is the outer wheels will see 60% more load than before, and the inners 60% less. Total available grip will drop by around 6% as a result of this load transfer. At the same time, the CoM of the vehicle will typically move laterally and vertically, relative to the contact patch by no more than 30 mm, leading to a weight transfer of less than 2%, and a corresponding reduction in grip of 0.01%.

== Traction ==
Load transfer causes the available traction at all four wheels to vary as the car brakes, accelerates, or turns. This bias to one pair of tires doing more "work" than the other pair results in a net loss of total available traction. The net loss can be attributed to the phenomenon known as tire load sensitivity.

An exception is during positive acceleration when the engine power is driving two or fewer wheels. In this situation where all the tires are not being utilized load transfer can be advantageous. As such, the most powerful cars are almost never front wheel drive, as the acceleration itself causes the front wheels' traction to decrease. This is why sports cars usually have either rear wheel drive or all wheel drive (and in the all wheel drive case, the power tends to be biased toward the rear wheels under normal conditions).

== Rollover ==
If (lateral) load transfer reaches the tire loading on one end of a vehicle, the inside wheel on that end will lift, causing a change in handling characteristic. If it reaches half the weight of the vehicle it will start to roll over. Some large trucks will roll over before skidding, while passenger vehicles and small trucks usually roll over only when they leave the road. Fitting racing tires to a tall or narrow vehicle and then driving it hard may lead to rollover.

== See also ==
- Anti-roll bar
- Bicycle and motorcycle dynamics
- Car handling
