= Sprung mass =

Portion of a vehicle supported by its suspension system

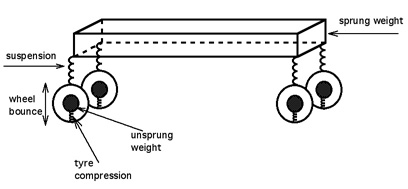
Sprung and unsprung mass are shown

Sprung mass (or sprung weight), in a vehicle with a suspension, such as an automobile, motorcycle, or a tank, is the portion of the vehicle's total mass that is supported by the suspension, including in most applications approximately half of the weight of the suspension itself. The sprung mass typically includes the body, frame, the internal components, passengers, and cargo, but does not include the mass of the components at the other end of the suspension components (including the wheels, wheel bearings, brake rotors, calipers, and/or continuous tracks (also called caterpillar tracks), if any), which are part of the vehicle's unsprung mass.

The larger the ratio of sprung mass to unsprung mass, the less the body and vehicle occupants are affected by bumps, dips, and other surface imperfections such as small bridges. However, a large sprung mass to unsprung mass ratio can also be deleterious to vehicle control.

== See also ==
- Unsprung mass
