= Camber angle =

Angle between a wheel's vertical axis and the vehicle's vertical axis

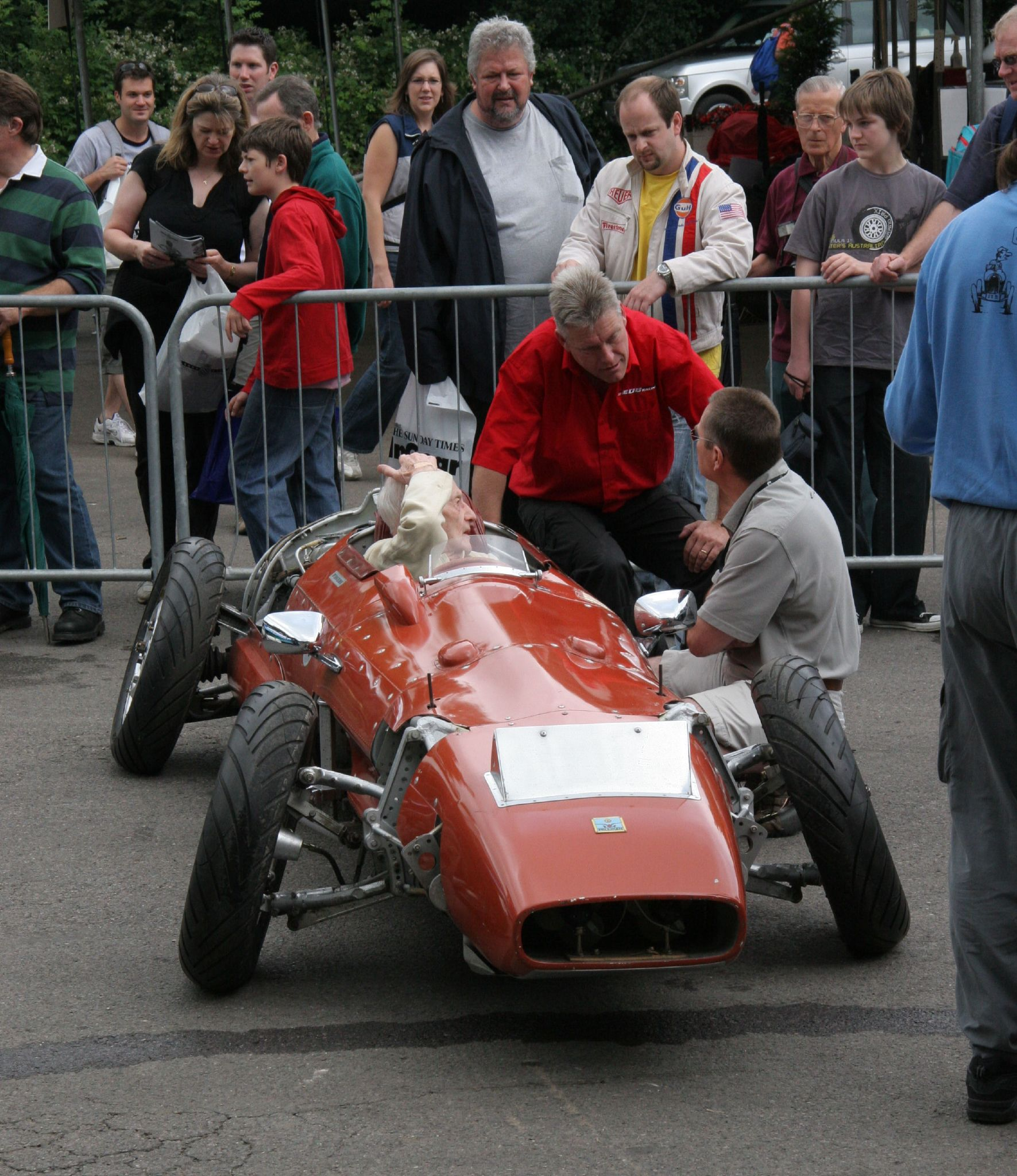
The 1960 Milliken MX1 Camber Car has a large negative camber

Camber angle is one of the angles made by the wheels of a vehicle. It is specifically the angle between the vertical axis of a wheel and the vertical axis of the vehicle when viewed from the front or rear. It is used in the creation of steering and suspension. If the top of the wheel is further out than the bottom (that is, tilted away from the axle), it is called positive camber; if the bottom of the wheel is further out than the top, it is called negative camber.

== Effect on handling ==
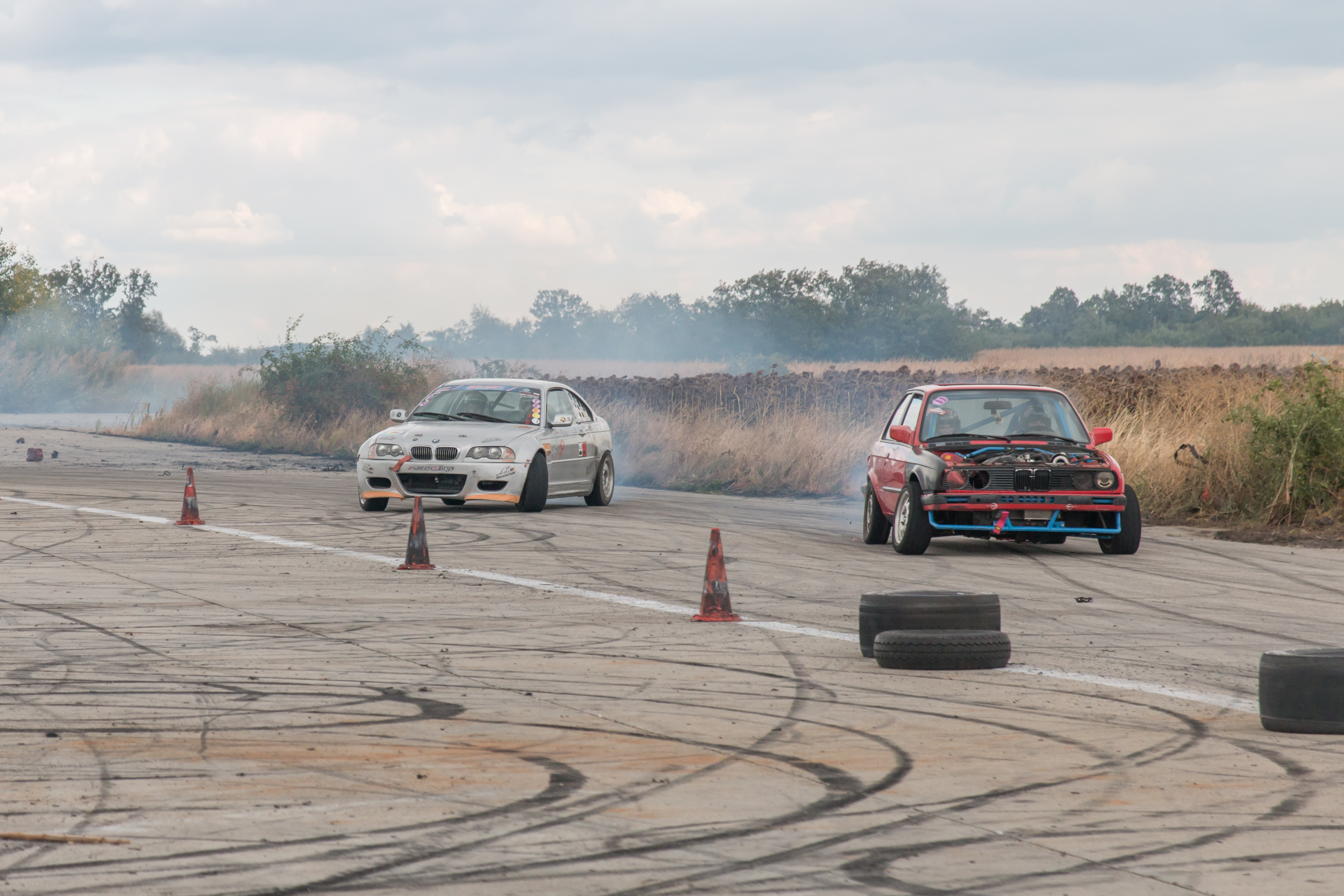
Negative front wheel camber is used in drift cars to improve their handling.

Camber angle alters the handling qualities of some suspension designs. In particular, negative camber improves grip in corners especially with a short long arms suspension. This is because it places the tire at a better angle to the road, transmitting the centrifugal forces through the vertical plane of the tire rather than through a shear force across it. The centrifugal (outwards) force is compensated for by applying negative camber, which turns the contact surface of the tire outwards to match, maximizing the contact patch area. Note that this is only true for the outside tire during the turn; the inside tire would benefit most from positive camber— again, only with a short long arms system. However, due to the weight transfer inherent while turning, the outside wheels bear more of the force of turning and negative camber will improve handling overall. Caster angle will also compensate for this to a degree, as the top of the outside tire will tilt slightly inward, and the inner tire will respectively tilt outward. However, any camber affects the contact patch of the tire while driving in a straight line. Zero camber gives the best traction as it maximizes the contact patch between the road and the tires and puts the tire tread flat on the road. Therefore excessive camber impairs straight driving in rain and snow and when accelerating hard.

Proper management of camber angle is a major factor in suspension design, and must incorporate not only idealized geometric models, but also real-life behavior of the components such as flex, distortion, elasticity, etc. What was once an art has become much more scientific with the use of computers, which can optimize all of the variables mathematically instead of relying on the designer's intuition and experience. As a result, the handling of even low-priced automobiles has improved dramatically. Heavy-duty vehicles, such as tractors, trucks, etc., tend to have more positive camber angle, so that when they are loaded and the whole vehicle lowers, the wheels are almost vertical.

== Adjustability ==
In cars with double wishbone suspensions, camber angle may be fixed or adjustable, but in MacPherson strut suspensions, it is normally fixed. The elimination of an available camber adjustment may reduce maintenance requirements, but if the car is lowered by use of shortened springs, the camber angle will change. Excessive camber angle can lead to increased tire wear and impaired handling. Significant suspension modifications may correspondingly require that the upper control arm or strut mounting points be altered to allow for some inward or outward movement, relative to the longitudinal centerline of the vehicle, for camber adjustment. With aftermarket plates containing slots for strut mounts instead of holes, this lets the entire shock absorber move back and forth, allowing for fine-tuning the camber of a vehicle. These plates are available for most of the commonly modified models of cars. Some aftermarket coilovers come with built-in camber plates already in place, and there are certain other aftermarket solutions which allow the modification of the camber angle of the wheels. Camber bolts with eccentrics allow adjustable camber on some vehicles. These bolts feature large washers that are either eccentric or offset. If the initial-equipment bolts are replaced with eccentric ones, then the adjustment will engender a change of up to two degrees. Control arms (or A-arms) with adjustable ball joints represent another avenue for allowing side-by-side adjustability. With these control arms installed, tire camber can effectively be changed by simply moving the tires. After that, one tightens the bolts in order to lock the ball joint in the desired position. Another aftermarket solution for changing the camber angle is via control rods of adjustable length. However, this solution is only amenable to vehicles that employ control rods, not A-arms. Since control rods are responsible for locating the suspension points and keeping them in place, changing the overall length of the rods influences the camber angle.

== Camber in uneven terrain ==
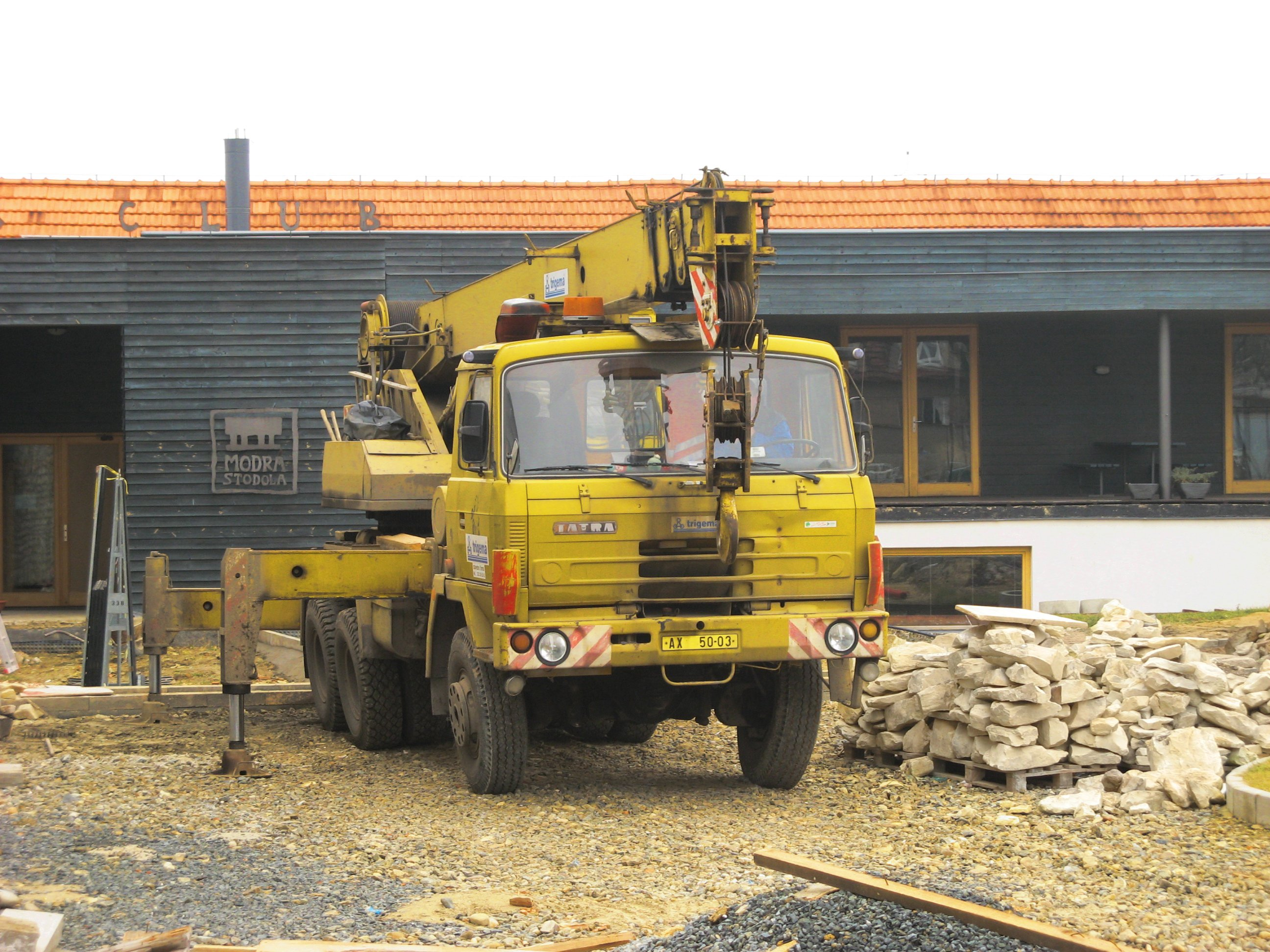
Tatra Trucks have quite acute positive camber due to their chassis design, which incorporates a central-tube and swing axles, as seen on this Tatra 815 crane truck.

Off-road vehicles such as agricultural tractors generally use positive camber. In such vehicles, the positive camber angle helps achieve a lower steering effort. Some single-engined general-aviation aircraft that are primarily meant to operate from unimproved surfaces, such as bush planes and cropdusters, also have their taildragger gear's main wheels equipped with positive-cambered main wheels to better handle the deflection of the landing gear, as the aircraft settles on rough, unpaved airstrips.

== Camber wear ==
If excessive camber—either positive or negative—is applied, the vehicle's tires will wear unevenly, a condition known as "camber wear".

A suspension with excessive negative camber places more load on the inboard shoulder of the tire, causing it to wear more quickly than the outboard shoulder. Depending on suspension design, however, a small amount of negative camber may slightly reduce tire wear during cornering, as lateral load transfers from the inside wheels to the outside wheels. With zero camber, this can cause the outside tire to develop positive camber under cornering, placing greater load on its outboard shoulder and potentially causing uneven wear. A small amount of negative camber can help compensate for this effect and distribute load more evenly across the tread.

Positive camber will generally place more load on the outboard shoulder, causing it to wear more quickly than the inboard shoulder. This is among the many reasons vehicles are not typically aligned with extreme positive or negative camber settings from the factory.

== Stance cars ==
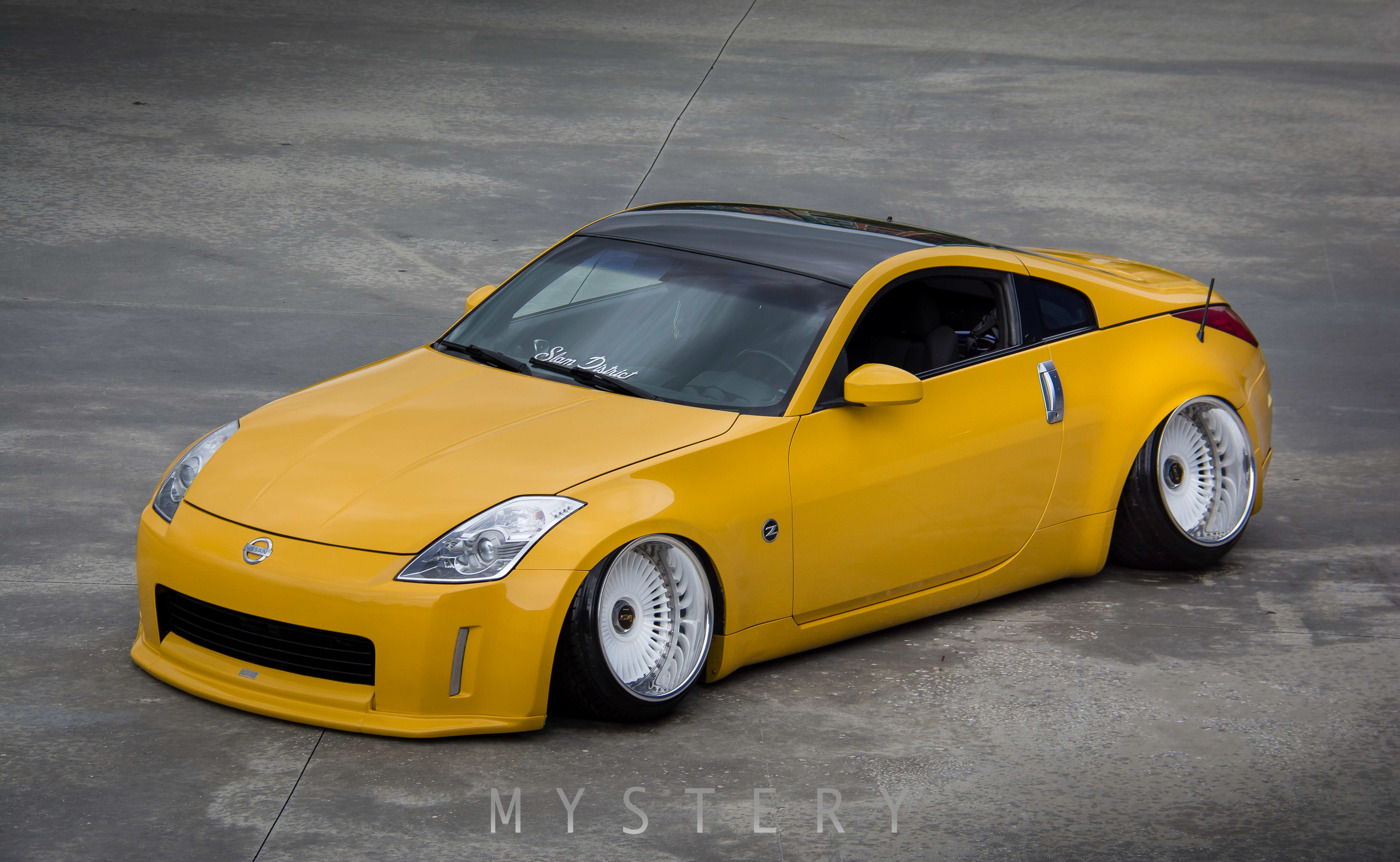
Negative camber on a "stanced" Nissan 350Z

Negative camber was primarily used in motorsports due to the traction increase around turns. However, it eventually became popular to use negative camber in order to be able to lower a car and fit wheels onto it which would not normally fit in the fender wells. Additionally, many cars have suspension layouts where the wheels naturally camber inwards when lowered below the factory ride height. Cars with these modifications eventually were given the name "stance cars". It is difficult to pinpoint when exactly this trend began, although it became mainstream in the 1970s with the bōsōzoku cars coming out of Japan. This trend began with the intent of making street cars look more like race cars by lowering their suspension and adding a little negative camber. As time went by, such cars were being customarily lowered more and more, as well as having much higher negative camber than before. With the growth of stance-car culture, it also attracted criticism, since extreme amounts of negative camber and minimal ground clearance can make these cars impractical.

== See also ==
- Camber thrust
- Caster angle
- Kingpin (automotive part)
- Toe (automotive)
- Vehicle dynamics

== Explanatory notes ==
1.While nearly every automobile now uses "negative camber" on all four wheels, this convention dates from a time when positive camber was more common.
