= Korres Engineering =

Korres
- Company type: Corporation
- Industry: Automotive
- Founded: 2002
- Founder: Dimitris Korres
- Headquarters: Athens, Greece
- Products: Automobiles
- Website: korresproject.gr

Korres Engineering, founded by architect and engineer Dimitris Korres in Athens, mainly focuses on design, consulting and subcontracting for civil engineering projects. It particularly specializes in complex structure relocation, while other branches undertake customized engineering tasks and vehicle design and development. Over the last two decades, it has completed dozens of challenging relocations of structures which include several ancient and medieval monuments and heavy structures such as an 1800-tonne 3-storey stone building of the Hellenic Railways Organization.

Vehicles developed include a 1000cc motorcycle (1989), a series of cars (P1 to P4, since 2002) featuring Korres's patented suspension system, combining high performance with extreme off-road capabilities, and D3, a city car design for disabled drivers, proposed in 2012.

In December 2020, Korres Engineering participated in the development of ventilators for COVID-19 patients.

== The project 4 ==
Korres P4 (or Project 4), the final/production version of the aforementioned series, was introduced in 2013. This combination of an exotic sports car with an extreme all-terrain vehicle, is powered by a 7-liter 505 hp GM engine, has a top speed of 300 km/h (190 mph) and can reach 100 km/h (62 mph) in 3.8 seconds.
