= Corvette leaf spring =

Type of independent suspension

A Corvette leaf spring is a type of independent suspension that utilizes a fiber-reinforced plastic (FRP) mono-leaf spring instead of more conventional coil springs. It is named after the Chevrolet Corvette, the American sports car for which it was originally developed and first utilized. A notable characteristic of this suspension configuration is the mounting of the mono-leaf spring such that it can serve as both ride spring and anti-roll spring. In contrast to many applications of leaf springs in automotive suspension designs, this type does not use the spring as a locating link. While this suspension type is most notably associated with several generations of the Chevrolet Corvette, the design has been used in other production General Motors cars, as well as vehicles from Volvo Cars and Mercedes-Benz Sprinter van. Fiat produced cars with a similar configuration, using a multi-leaf steel spring in place of the FRP mono-leaf spring.

== Design ==
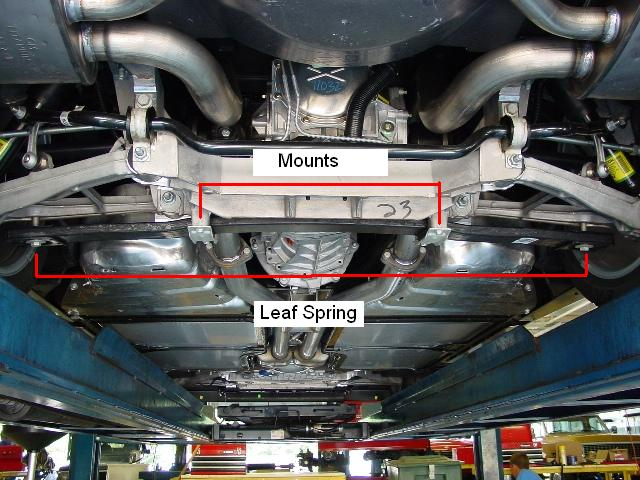
The C5 Corvette's rear suspension

The leaf-spring suspension configuration is independent, because the movement of one wheel is not determined by the position of the other. Control arms are utilized to define the motion of the wheel as the suspension is compressed. The usual coil springs are replaced with a single FRP spring, which spans the width of the car. As in independent suspension systems using coil springs, and unlike the common leaf-spring supported Hotchkiss rear axle, the suspension kinematics are defined only by the control arms.

As in a coil-spring suspension design, the FRP mono-leaf spring supports the weight of the vehicle. However, the FRP leaf springs differ from steel coils and traditional steel multi-leaf springs in a number of significant ways. The FRP plastic springs have 4.3–5.5 times the strain energy storage per weight, compared to steel. This results in a lighter spring for a given application. The single FRP mono-leaf front spring used on the fourth-generation Corvette is 33 percent of the weight of an equivalent set of coil springs. Comparing FRP to conventional steel leaf springs in similar applications, the weight saved is even greater. The third-generation Corvette offered an optional FRP mono-leaf spring as an alternative to the standard multi-leaf steel spring, the 22-kilogram (48 lb) steel spring being replaced by a 3-kilogram (7 lb) FRP spring. Volvo claims a weight savings of 5 kilograms (10 lb) by using a FRP spring in the rear suspension of its second-generation XC90, compared to designs using coil springs.

The relative sliding movement of the leaves of a multi-leaf steel spring results in stiction-based hysteresis with respect to spring compression. This stiction reduces suspension compliance and can compromise both ride quality and handling. Lacking individual leaves, the mono-leaf spring avoids stiction.

FRP springs are advertised as having exceptional cycle life and corrosion resistance. A GM test comparing the third-generation Corvette springs found that failure of the multi-leaf steel springs was likely after 200,000 full-travel cycles. The replacement FRP leaf spring showed no loss of performance after two million full cycles.

Packaging is cited as both an advantage and disadvantage of the transverse FRP leaf spring, as compared to coil springs, depending on the application. The FRP spring is typically set low in the suspension, resulting in a low center of gravity. It also allows manufacturers to avoid tall spring mounts, thus resulting in a flatter load floor about the suspension. James Schefter reports that, as used on the C5 and later Corvettes, the use of OEM coilover damper springs would have forced the chassis engineers to either vertically raise the shock towers or move them inward. In the rear this would have reduced trunk space. In the front this would have interfered with engine packaging. The use of the leaf spring allowed the spring to be placed under the chassis, out of the way, while keeping the diameter of the shock-absorber assembly to that of just the damper, rather than damper and spring. However, in other applications, such as race car designs, the need to span the width of the vehicle resulted in significant design limitations. Coil and torsion springs present better packaging options for racing applications. FRP springs also have limited availability and selection as compared to coil springs. Higher cost has also been cited as a disadvantage, when comparing FRP springs to coil springs on production road cars.

== Properties ==
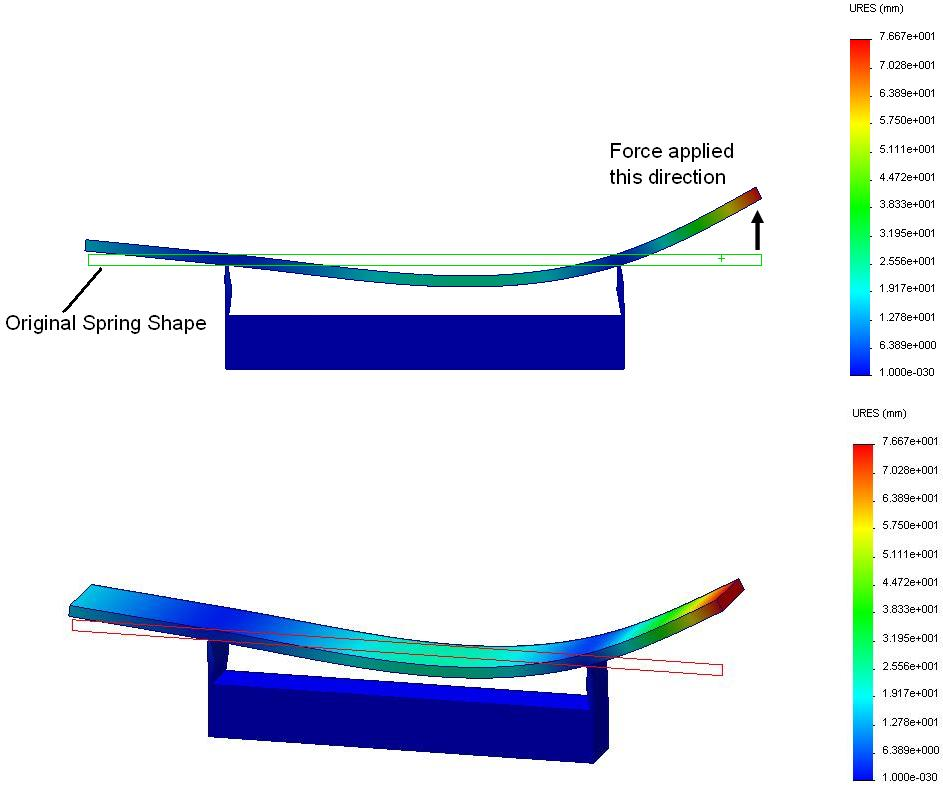
FEA model of a leaf spring under load. The initial, unbent shape of the spring is shown as a silhouette box. An upward deflection on the right side of the spring results in a smaller upward movement on the left side.

An advantage of the FRP transverse leaf springs—when supported with widely spaced, pivotable mounts—is the ability to replace the anti-roll bar. Typically springs that provide a sufficient ride rate need a supplemental spring (the anti-roll bar) to increase the suspension roll rate. The coupling of the two sides of the transverse leaf spring across the vehicle results in an anti-roll bar like behavior. Corvette engineers have cited this property as enabling the use of a lighter anti-roll bar, and even eliminating the rear anti-roll bar on some versions of the seventh generation Corvette.

When either wheel is deflected upward, the center span of the spring (the portion between the pivotable mounts) deflects downward. If both wheels deflect upward at the same time (for example, when hitting a bump in the road) the center section bends uniformly between the pivot mounts. In a roll, only one wheel is deflected upwards, which tends to form the center of the spring into an S-shaped curve. The result is that the wheel rate of one side of the suspension depends on the displacement of the other side. The extent to which the spring acts as an anti-roll bar depends on the distance between the pivot mounts and their rigidity.

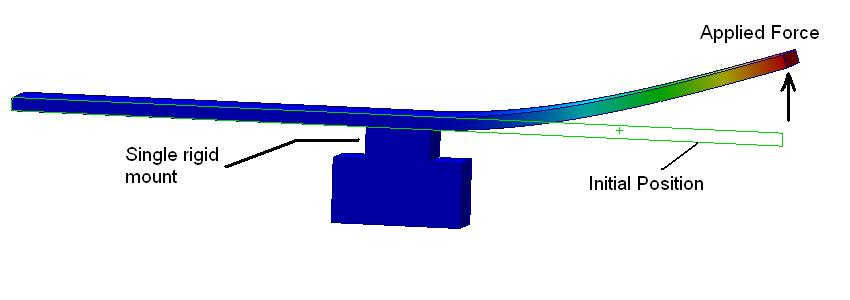
A transverse leaf spring with a central rigid mount. The two spring halves are effectively isolated. Movements of one half of the spring do not affect the other half.

A simplified flat, rectangular spring illustrates this principle. Deflecting the right side of the spring results in the left side rising. By comparison, a rigid central mount (2nd and 3rd generation Corvettes and other cars) shows no movement on one side when the other is deflected.

== Applications ==
A number of manufacturers have produced vehicles or concepts utilizing independent front or rear suspensions supported by transverse leaf springs that have an anti-roll effect.

- Chevrolet Corvette: C4 1984–1996 (front only, centrally mounted rear spring did not have the anti-roll effect), C5–C7, 1997–2019 (front and rear).
- General Motors W platform cars: first generation (Lumina, Grand Prix, Regal, Cutlass Supreme).
- General Motors E platform cars: (Eldorado, Toronado, Riviera, Reatta, Allante).
- Volvo 960 (from model year 1995) renamed to S90 (sedan)/V90 (wagon) from model year 1997 to 1998.
- Volvo V60 (Polestar Engineered), Volvo V90 and Volvo XC90 (second generation).
- Mercedes-Benz Sprinter vans (front only, Hotchkiss in rear).
- Opel GT: 1969–1973 (Front only), Trailing arm with coil springs, panhard bar (Rear).
- Smart ForTwo Mk1-Mk3 (used with MacPherson Struts).
- Volkswagen 1-litre car, prototype.
- Indigo 3000, a Swedish made, low volume roadster. Due to the anti-roll properties of the transverse leaf-spring, the car does not employ a separate front anti-roll bar.
- Fiat 128, which used a similar system with a more traditional multi-leaf steel spring but configured with two pivots to provide the anti-roll effect.
- Some later models of Triumph Spitfire and Triumph GT6 used rear transverse steel leaf springs with anti-roll pivot mounts.
- Transverse leaf spring and solid axle front suspension of early Ford cars.

== Recent patents and related research ==
Several automotive companies have filed patents for suspension designs using a transverse composite leaf-spring supported in a fashion similar to that of the Corvette.

- Ford Global Technologies, 2006, patent #7029017, Wheel suspension for a motor vehicle with a transverse leaf spring.
- Porsche AG, 2000, patent # 6029987, Front Axle for a Motor Vehicle. Describes a strut suspension system supported by a transverse leaf-spring system largely the same as that used by the Corvette. The Porsche patent mentions the beneficial stabilizing effects of this arrangement.
- Honda, 1992, Transverse leaf spring type suspension patent #5141209.
- DaimlerChrysler, 2004, patent #6811169, Composite Spring Design that also Performs the Lower Control Arm Function for a Conventional or Active Suspension System.
- ZF released a concept rear suspension design, in October 2009, using a composite spring-based rear suspension. The strut-based suspension uses a transverse leaf spring to function as both ride and anti-roll spring. The ZF concept differs from the system used on the Corvette by using the leaf spring as one of the suspension links.

== See also ==
- Leaf spring
