= Torque tube =

Power transmission and braking technology

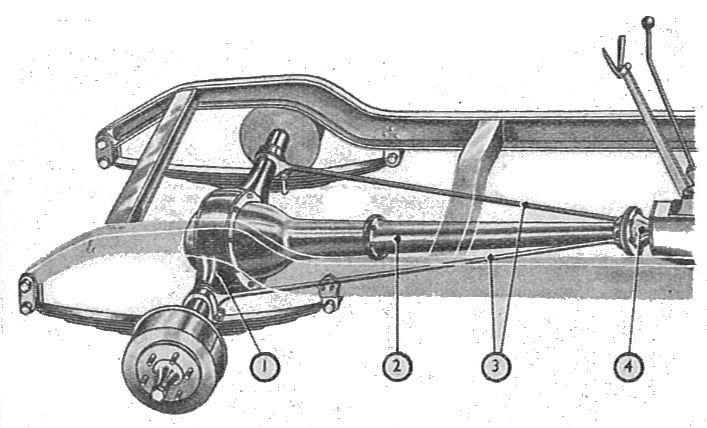
Number 2 is the torque tube, which ends on the left at the flange where it bolts to the differential housing. Number 1 is the differential housing. Number 3 is the pair of radius arms. Number 4 is the torque ball.

A torque tube is a power transmission component consisting of a stationary tubular housing around the drive shaft, often used in front-engine, rear-wheel-drive automobiles with a solid rear axle. The purpose of a torque tube is to hold the rear axle in place during acceleration and braking to prevent "axle wrap", which is when the axle pitches up during acceleration and down during braking.

Its use is not as widespread in modern automobiles as is the Hotchkiss drive, which performs the same function by instead anchoring the axle housings to the leaf springs using spring perches.

== Construction ==
Rudimentary torque tube

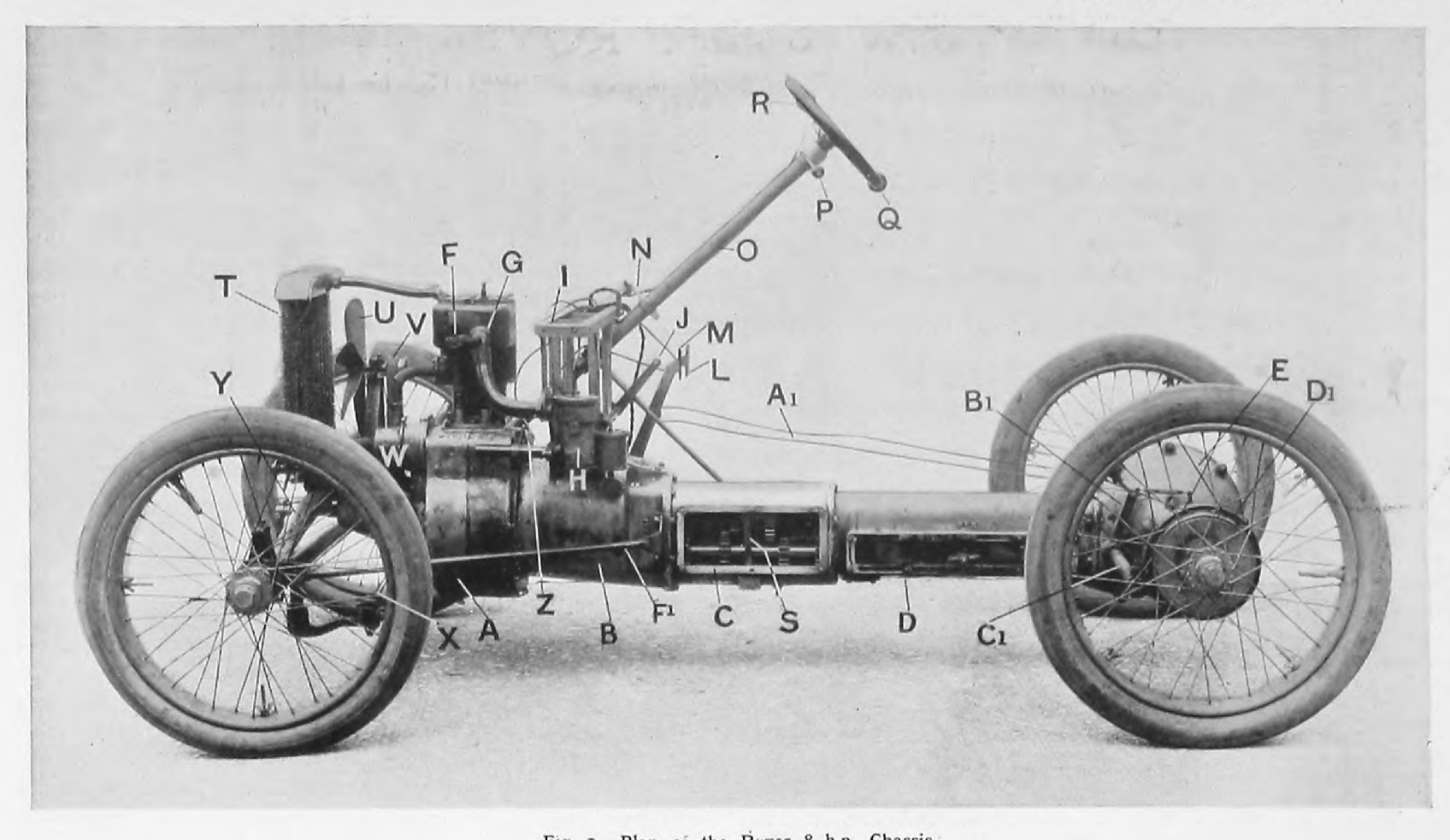
The 1904 Rover 8 chassis in side and plan.

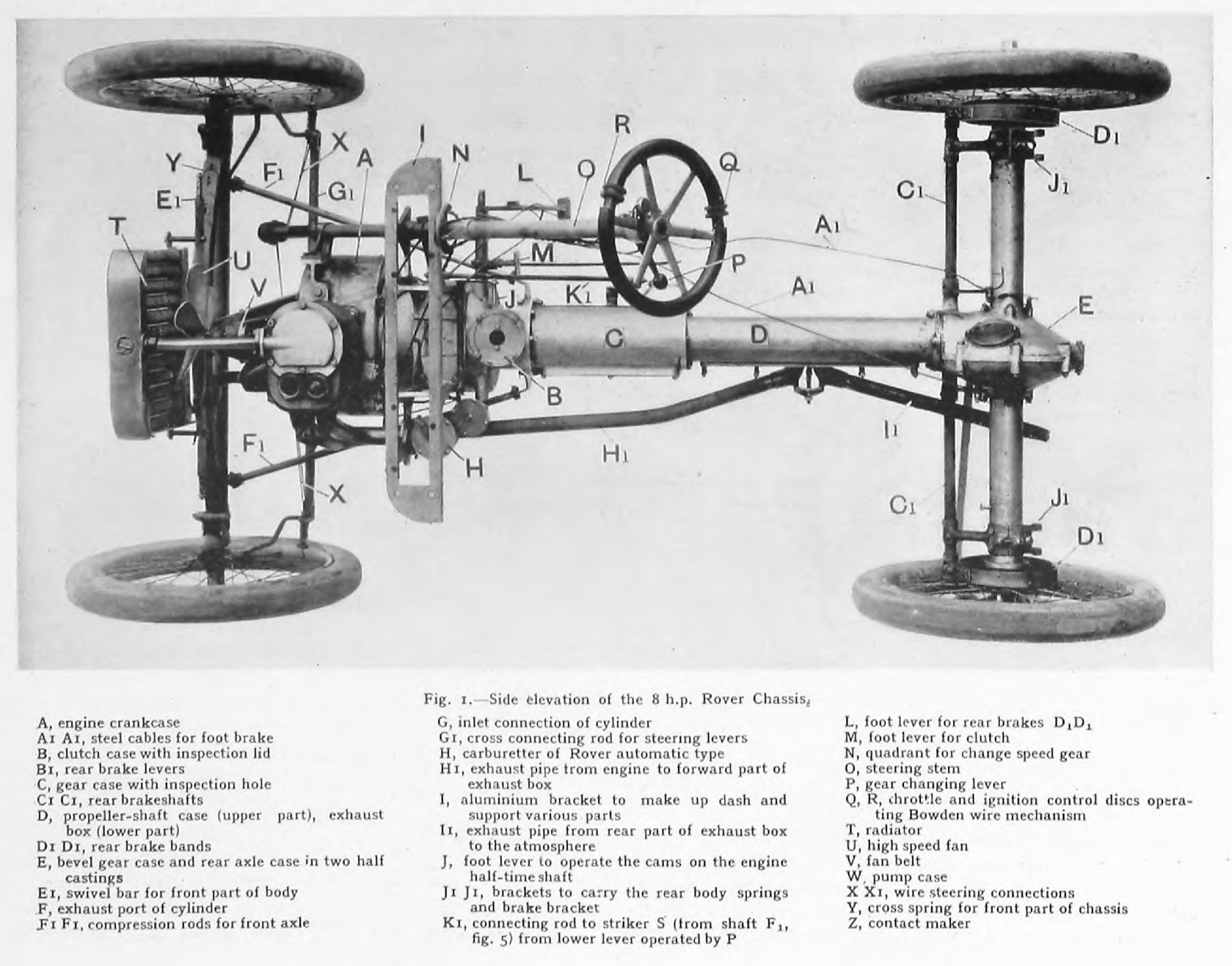
The Rover 8 had a torque-tube like backbone, lacking any pivoting joints between the transmission and differential casing.

The "torque" referred to in the name is not that of the driveshaft along the axis of the car, but that applied by the rear wheels, the reaction of which is the differential or axle housing trying to turn in the opposite direction (i.e. forwards or backwards). The torque tube solves that problem by coupling the differential housing to the transmission housing, transferring forward and braking torque through the entire powertrain assembly to the car frame. In contrast, the Hotchkiss drive transmits torque forces to the car frame via suspension components such as leaf springs or trailing arms. Since the torque tube does not constrain lateral axle movement, a Panhard rod is often used for this purpose. The combination of a torque tube and Panhard rod allows for the easy implementation of coil springs in the rear to improve ride quality, as in Buicks after 1937.

A ball-and-socket universal joint called a "torque ball" is used at one end of the torque tube to transmit torque while allowing for relative motion between the axle and transmission due to suspension travel. Later American Motors Rambler models (1962 through 1966) used a flange and cushion mount in place of the ball and socket. In most applications, the drive shaft uses a single universal joint at the torque ball, causing speed fluctuations when the joint is not straight. The Hotchkiss drive uses two universal joints, which cancel out each other's speed fluctuations even when bent. V8-powered 1963 through 1966 AMC Ramblers used a double-Cardan constant velocity joint to eliminate driveshaft speed fluctuations, though six-cylinder and earlier V8 models used only one standard universal joint.

The torque tube design provides a rigid rear end and assures alignment under all conditions. However, because of the greater unsprung weight of the torque tube and radius rods, there may be a "little hopping around of the rear end when cornering fast or on washboard roads".

== Application ==
=== United States ===
Examples of torque tubes in the US are those in Fords through 1948, including over 19 million Model Ts, as Ford used less expensive transverse springs that could not withstand forward torque on their own. Chevrolet used the torque tube for many of those years, while Buick used it starting with the 1906 Model D. The torque tube also allowed Buick, beginning in 1938, to use coil springs for a softer ride than traditional leaf springs (which, unlike coils, are compatible with a Hotchkiss drive). The use of a torque tube and coil springs became a Buick "engineering trademark" until it was dropped with the 1961 model year full-sized models.

The Nash 600 adopted a torque tube in 1941 without an enclosed joint, but utilized a design wherein a "horizontal yoke at the front end of the torque tube is supported by rubber biscuits at each side." After the merger of Nash and Hudson in 1954, American Motors Corporation (AMC) continued to use the coil-spring-and-torque-tube rear suspension design on their large-sized cars (Rambler Classic and Ambassador) from the 1956 through 1966 model years. The enclosed driveshaft made for more complicated gear swaps and hampered hot rodders. After its discontinuation, it was replaced by a new design utilizing an open driveshaft and a four-link axle-location system.

The 1961 Pontiac Tempest was introduced as a new model featuring an inline 4 coupled to a transaxle via a torque tube, giving it a perfect 50-50 front-rear weight balance.

The 1976-1988 Chevrolet Chevette and the similar Pontiac T-1000 used a torque tube and center bearing. This design was unlike any other Chevrolet model "to isolate impacts to the rear wheels, cut down on road noise, and reduce engine vibration", and it "also allows a reduction in the height of the drive shaft and tunnel."

The continuing limited production of the Avanti switched to a new chassis in 1986 that utilized a torque tube along with an independent rear suspension.

The Chevrolet Corvette has used a torque tube since the 1996 introduction of the fifth-generation C5 model for the 1997 model year.

=== Europe ===
The Peugeot 403 and 404 models used a torque tube. The Peugeot 504 and Peugeot 505 station wagons, as well as most export sedans, also had torque tubes, while domestic and European-market sedan models had a transaxle and independent rear suspension.

The Mercedes-Benz SLS AMG has a torque tube, but only to align the transaxle with the engine.
