= Korres P4 =

Overview
- Manufacturer: Korres Engineering
- Production: 2014–present
- Assembly: Katerini, Greece; Utah, United States; (planned)
- Designer: Dimitris Korres; Vasilis Spandagos; Dorothea Mitropoulou

Body and chassis
- Class: Sports car
- Body style: 2-door coupé
- Layout: Mid engine, all wheel drive; Rear-wheel drive (optional); Four-wheel drive (optional)

Powertrain
- Engine: 7.0 liter LS7 V8
- Transmission: 6-speed manual

Dimensions
- Wheelbase: 2,670 mm (105 in)
- Length: 3,920 mm (154 in)
- Width: 1,960 mm (77 in)
- Height: 1,250–1,750 mm (49–69 in) (lowest-highest position)
- Curb weight: 1,600 kg (3,500 lb)

The Korres P4 is a Greek sports car designed by Korres Engineering. It is a true all-terrain vehicle utilizing a suspension design based on the principle of wheel interdependence.

== Specifications and performance ==
=== Engine ===
The Korres P4 is powered by a 7.0 litre naturally aspirated LS7 V8 505 bhp (376 kW) Corvette engine, allowing the Korres P4 to reach 68 mph (100 km/h) in 3.8 seconds with a top speed of 186 mph (299 km/h).

=== Transmission ===
The gearbox is made specifically for the car and features a 6-speed manual transmission (2.538, 1.611, 1.208, 0.933, 0.777, 0.560) with 3 transfer case ratios, normal (1:1 ratio), sports (1.62:1 ratio) and trial (5.95:1 ratio). The P4 has a theoretical top speed of over 300 km/h (190 mph).

=== Handling ===
The car's suspension is made by Korres Engineering. The P4 features an adjustable ride height suspension system that can raise the car's ride height by 400mm to help it negotiate rocks and other obstacles. Generally, a low ride height means sharp steering control.

=== Performance ===
The Korres has a top speed of 300 km/h (186 mph) and can accelerate from 0 to 100 km/h (62 mph) in 3.8 seconds. P4 has a GVWR weight of 1,700 kg (3,700 lb).

Displacement	7,000 cc (427.2 cu in)
Max. power	512 PS (377 kW; 505 hp) @ 6,300 rpm
Weight to Power	3.17 kg (6.99 lb) / hp
Max. torque	637 N⋅m (470 lb⋅ft) @ 4,800 rpm

== Features ==
- Front-to-back diagonal wheel interconnection provides both anti-roll and anti-pitch.
- Cockpit adjustable ride height control.
- Adjustable overall suspension stiffness when altering vehicle ride height (low=stiff, high=soft).
- Unmatched off-road capabilities (for a vehicle with 4 regular-sized wheels).
- Reliable and robust mechanical interconnection of wheels through push-rods, levers and torsion bars without the use of electronics or hydro-pneumatic systems.
- Excellent ability to absorb bumps, offer a very smooth ride, and have great control over extremely uneven surfaces.
- Precise wheel tracking on extremely rough and uneven terrain.
- Increased grip on slippery or loose surfaces.
- Extremely high level of axle articulation (suspension flex, warp).
- Little roll when cornering (high roll stiffness).
- True sports car handling when fully lowered.
- Sturdy vehicle dynamics.
- Ultra-compact, fully synchronized, manual 6-speed gearbox.
- 3 different transfer case ratios, cruise (direct 1:1 ratio), sport (1.62:1 ratio) and trial (5.95:1 ratio).
- Crawl ratio of 56:1.
- Center differential with selectable all-wheel-drive (AWD) and 4WD (locked center differential).
- Selectable rear-wheel drive (RWD).

On a dynamometer and in AWD, driveline losses were measured at 11%.
