= Obadiah Elliott =

British 18th–19th century inventor

- Born: 1763; Tonbridge, Kent
- Died: 13 January 1838; Plaistow, Kent
- Resting place: St Georges Church, Beckenham, Kent

Obadiah Elliott (1763 – 13 January 1838) was a British inventor from Tonbridge, Kent who patented in 1804 the method of mounting coach bodies on elliptical springs attached directly to the axles, replacing the traditional heavy perch.

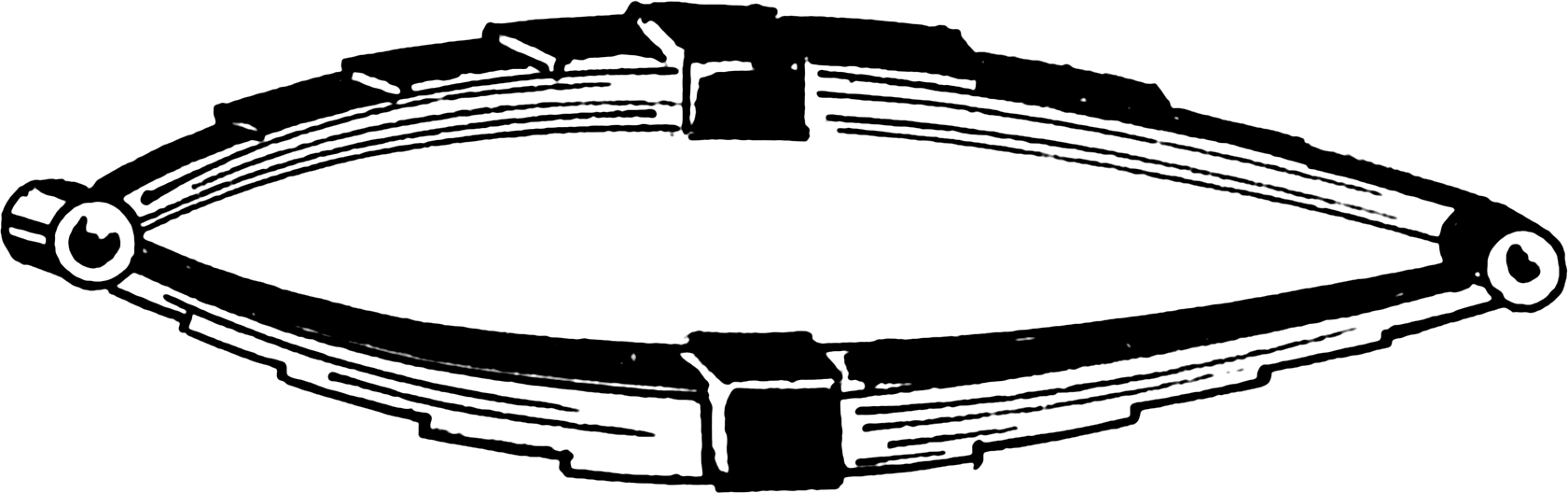
Elliptic springs

The elliptic spring consisted of steel plates piled on top of one another and pinned together; it is the same method still used in rear suspensions. His invention was a major breakthrough in carriage design and it inspired a boom in the construction and sale of lightweight private carriages.

Ultimately, there was greater investment in roads and the beginnings of a national network. Travel by road until the 19th century was done on foot or on horseback. Other than local carts, goods were transported by pack animal. There was little if any investment in the roads which were nothing more than rough tracks or, at best, the remains of Roman roads. Any carriages and carts were forced by rough surfaces to go at a horse's walking pace only. Elliott's invention ensured stability and carriage travel became safe with a much smoother ride, subject to road repair and maintenance.

Elliott died at Plaistow in 1838 aged 75 and was buried with other members of his family at St Georges Church, Beckenham, Kent. He had married twice and had 12 children. On his death his estate comprised at least 5 large houses, 2 carriage workshops and a half share of the prosperous Westminster carriage firm of Elliott and Holbrook.
