= Hotchkiss drive =

Shaft drive form of power transmission

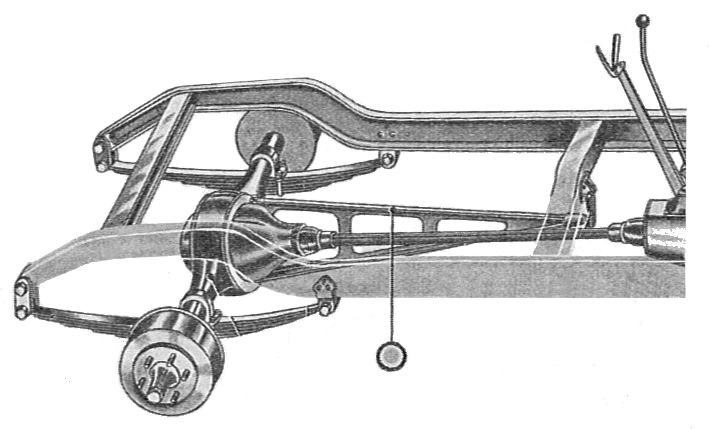
Rear chassis, possibly of a Napier, with torque reaction taken by a long girder alongside the jointed driveshaft

The Hotchkiss drive is a shaft drive form of power transmission. It was the dominant means for front-engine, rear-wheel drive layout cars in the 20th century. The name comes from the French automobile manufacturer Hotchkiss, although other makers, such as Peerless, used similar systems before Hotchkiss.

During the early part of the 20th century, chain-drive power transmission was the main direct-drive competitor of the Hotchkiss system, with the torque tube also popular until the 1950s. The problem is how to transfer the axle torque, which is the tendency of the drive axle to spin in the opposite direction of the drive wheels, to the car. The problem is also seen in braking, when the axle is forced in the same direction as the braking wheels.

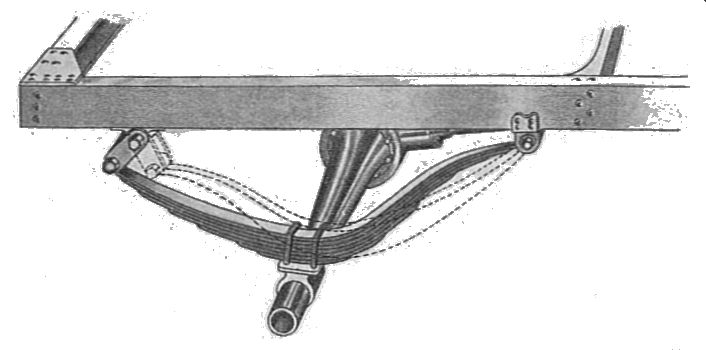
Torque reaction effects on a leaf spring in a Hotchkiss drive system

Most shaft-drive systems consist of a drive shaft (also called a propeller shaft or Cardan shaft) extending from the transmission in front to the differential in the rear. The differentiating characteristic of the Hotchkiss drive is the fact that the axle housing is firmly attached to the leaf springs to transfer the axle torque through them to the car body. Also, it uses universal joints at both ends of the driveshaft, which is not enclosed. The use of two universal joints, properly phased and with parallel alignment of the drive and driven shafts, allows the use of simple cross-type universals. In contrast, a torque tube arrangement uses only a single universal at the end of the transmission tailshaft, typically a constant velocity joint, and the axle housing is held fast by the torque tube, which anchors the differential housing to the transmission.

In the Hotchkiss drive, slip-splines or a plunge-type (ball and trunnion) u-joint eliminate thrust transmitted back up the driveshaft from the axle, allowing simple rear-axle positioning using parallel leaf springs. In the torque-tube type, this thrust is taken by the torque tube to the transmission and thence to the transmission and motor mounts to the frame. While the torque-tube type, when combined with rear coil springs (as on 1938–62 Buick models), requires additional locating elements, such as a Panhard rod, this is not needed with a torque tube/leaf spring combination (as on 1906–37 Buick and early Ford models).

Some Hotchkiss driveshafts are made in two pieces with another universal joint in the center for greater flexibility and typically used in trucks and specialty vehicles built on firetruck frames. Some installations use rubber mounts to isolate noise and vibration. The 1984–1987 RWD Toyota Corolla (i.e., Corolla SR5 and GT-S) coupe is another example of a car that uses a 2-part Hotchkiss driveshaft with a rubber-mounted center bearing.

This design was the main form of power transmission for most cars from the 1920s through the 1970s. As of 2016 it remained common in pick-up trucks and sport utility vehicles.

Just as important as power transmission is braking. In power transmission, the torque applied to the wheels is countered by an equal and opposite reaction in the axle housing, but in braking, the torque of braking the wheels is equal but in the same direction. In a rear-wheel-drive car, the braking applied by the rear brakes is just as important as the power transmission, and the problem is the same and is solved in the same manner. Firmly anchoring the axle housing to the leaf springs transfers both directions of torque (acceleration and braking) to the car body.

The Hotchkiss drive has no connection either to the modern-day U.S. suspension-modification company Hotchkis or to Tom Hotchkiss, a race car driver from Hoboken, New Jersey.
