= Dual pivot steering geometry =

Dual-pivot steering geometry (also known as virtual pivot) is a geometric arrangement of linkages in the steering of a car designed to reduce or eliminate scrub radius by moving the pivot point of the king pin outboard, in order to improve steering precision and straight line stability.

It is typically used with a MacPherson strut, but can also be applied to a double wishbone suspension. In either case, the difference is that the single bottom wishbone is replaced by a pair of suspension links forming a trapezoidal four-bar linkage. This allows the kingpin to pivot about a pivot point nearer the center of the wheel's contact patch instead of the traditional pivot point at the ball joint of the bottom wishbone.

== See also ==
- Scrub radius
- MacPherson strut
- Double wishbone suspension
- King pin
- Steering
- Four-bar linkage
- Ackermann steering geometry
- Control arm
- Radius rod
