= Steering kickback =

Steering kickback relates to the sharp and rapid movements of an automobile's steering wheel as the front wheels encounter a significant obstruction or imperfection in the road. The amount of kickback is dependent on a variety of factors, namely the angle of impact with the obstruction or imperfection, health and stiffness of the vehicle's shock absorbers, and the speed of the vehicle, as well as the type of steering mechanism used and its mechanical advantage.

Rack and pinion steering may be susceptible to kickback, as the steering rack transmits forces in either direction. A steering box design, such as recirculating ball, is much less sensitive. Despite this, the other advantages of rack and pinion steering have led to its almost universal adoption, at least for light automobiles.

Steering kickback is distinct from torque steering, bump steer or roll steer. These are similar outside influences that affect the direction of travel, but they do not cause a movement at the driver's wheel.

Force feedback sim racing wheels and drive by wire wheels have motors to simulate steering kickback.

== Mitigation ==
Steering kickback is a phenomenon which vehicle makers try to minimize in an early design phase of every vehicle because minimizing this phenomenon after vehicle deployment can be quite difficult. A major decrease of the force and velocity of the kickback requires changes in the suspension kinematics, namely the kingpin inclination and offset, and also in the steering mechanism by changing lever ratio between fixed steering arms and pitman arms.

Common ways to reduce kickback as an aftermarket solution can be by installing a steering damper or a one way valve on the pressure port of the steering gear, but installing this solution may have bad impact on returnability to center, and may cause substantial wear on the tie rods and steering gear in the case of installing an aftermarket one way valve on the pressure port.
