= BMW iX3 =

Battery electric compact luxury crossover SUV

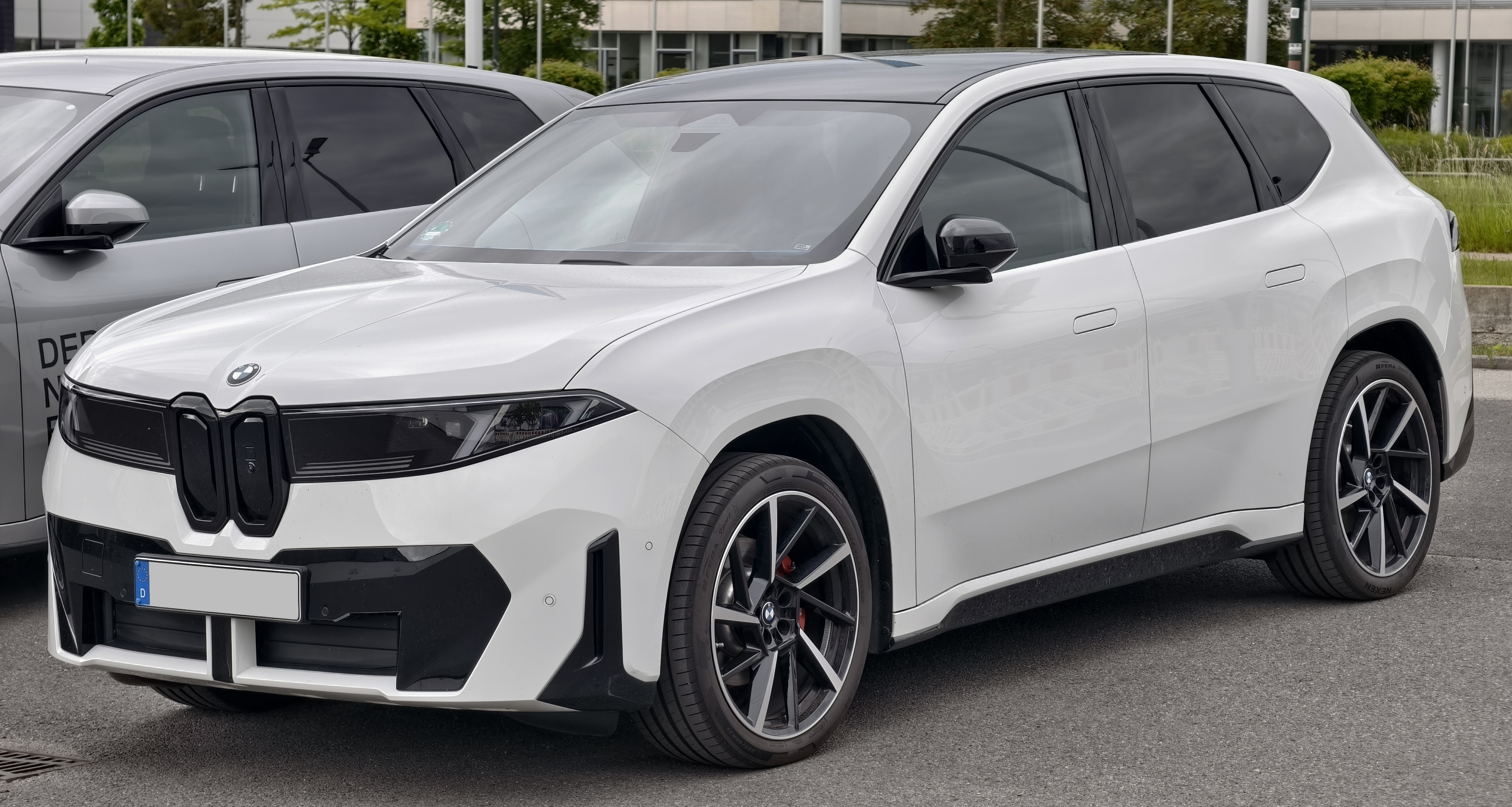
- BMW iX3 50 xDrive M Sport

Overview
- Manufacturer: BMW
- Model code: NA5; NA6 (LWB)
- Production: October 2025 – present
- Assembly: Hungary: Debrecen; China: Dadong (BBA, LWB); Mexico: San Luis Potosi
- Designer: Adrian van Hooydonk (head of design)

Body and chassis
- Class: Compact luxury SUV (D-segment)
- Body style: 5-door crossover SUV
- Layout: Rear-motor, rear-wheel-drive (iX3 40 / iX3 30L); Dual-motor, all-wheel-drive (iX3 50/M60 xDrive / iX3 40L/50L xDrive)
- Platform: Neue Klasse platform
- Related: BMW iX4; BMW i3 (NA0)

Powertrain
- Electric motor: Externally-excited synchronous (rear), AC induction (front)
- Power output: 261–603 hp (195–450 kW; 265–611 PS)
- Battery: 77 kWh LFP CATL; 82.7 kWh NMC; 86.9 kWh NMC CATL; 108.7 kWh NMC Eve Energy; 113.4 kWh NMC Eve Energy
- Electric range: 383–434 mi (616–698 km) (EPA); 515–806 km (320–501 mi) (WLTP); 630–919 km (391–571 mi) (CLTC)
- Plug-in charging: DC: 300–400 kW

Dimensions
- Wheelbase: 2,897 mm (114.1 in); 3,005 mm (118.3 in) (LWB)
- Length: 4,782 mm (188.3 in); 4,885 mm (192.3 in) (LWB)
- Width: 1,895 mm (74.6 in)
- Height: 1,635 mm (64.4 in)
- Kerb weight: 2,285 kg (5,038 lb)

Chronology
- Predecessor: BMW iX3 (G08)

The BMW iX3 (NA5) is a battery electric compact luxury crossover SUV manufactured by BMW, succeeding the X3-based G08. Unlike its predecessor, it is built on the Neue Klasse platform, no longer sharing its platform with its counterpart (G45). A long-wheelbase version, codenamed NA6, is slated to release in the Chinese market in 2026. The car is the first to use this new design language of BMW and was first shown in 2024 at the Paris Auto Show.

== Overview ==
=== BMW Vision Neue Klasse X concept ===
The BMW Vision Neue Klasse X concept was first announced by BMW in March 2024, previewing the design of the upcoming iX3.

BMW Vision Neue Klasse X concept

Rear view

=== Launch ===
The second-generation iX3 made its production debut at the 2025 Munich Motor Show, as the first BMW under the Neue Klasse generation. Only one powertrain version was launched - the iX3 50 xDrive. BMW is expected to announce a rear-wheel drive iX3 40 variant.

Production of the iX3 is expected to start at San Luis Potosi, Mexico in 2027, the third location to produce the vehicle after Debrecen, Hungary and Shenyang, China.

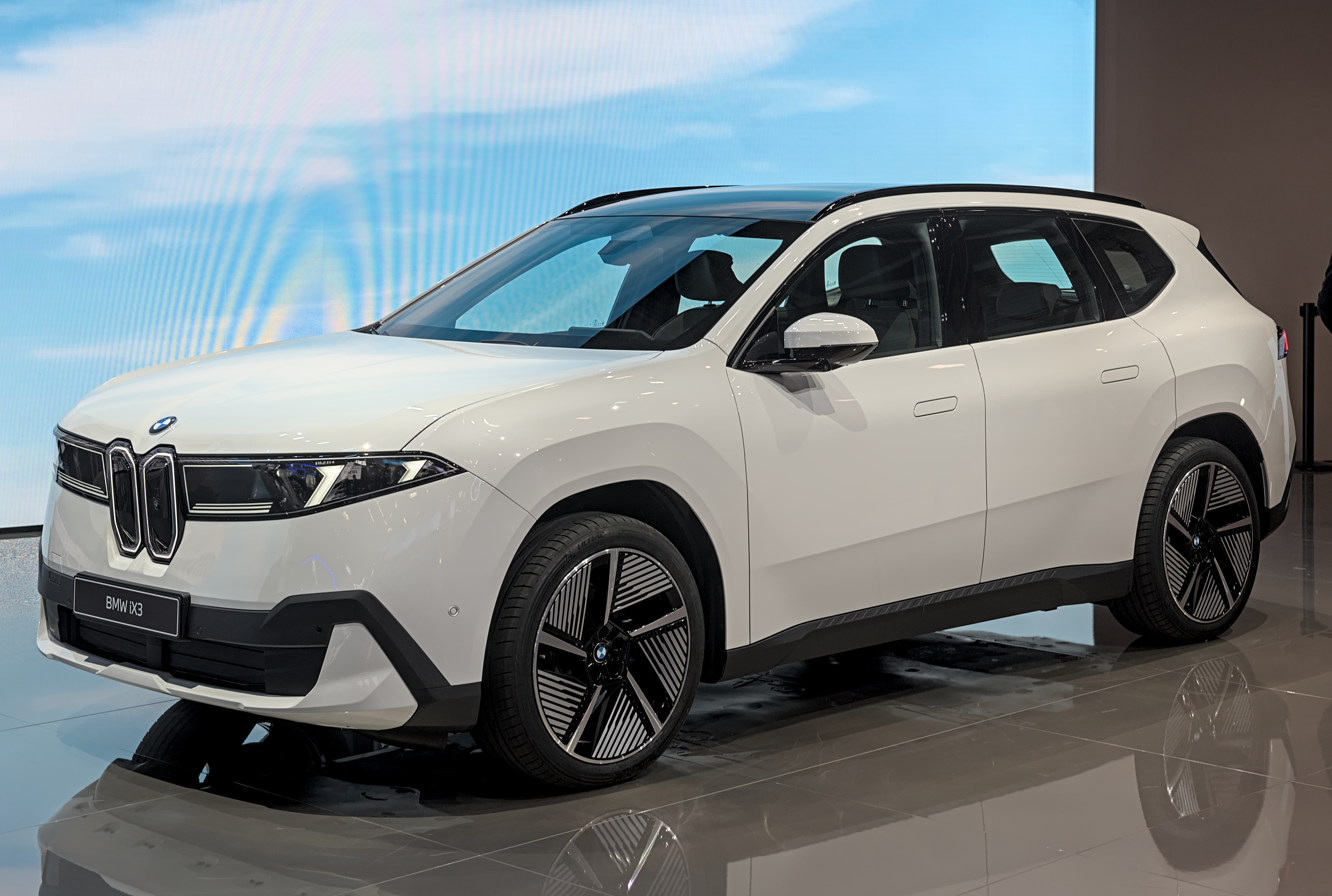
Front view

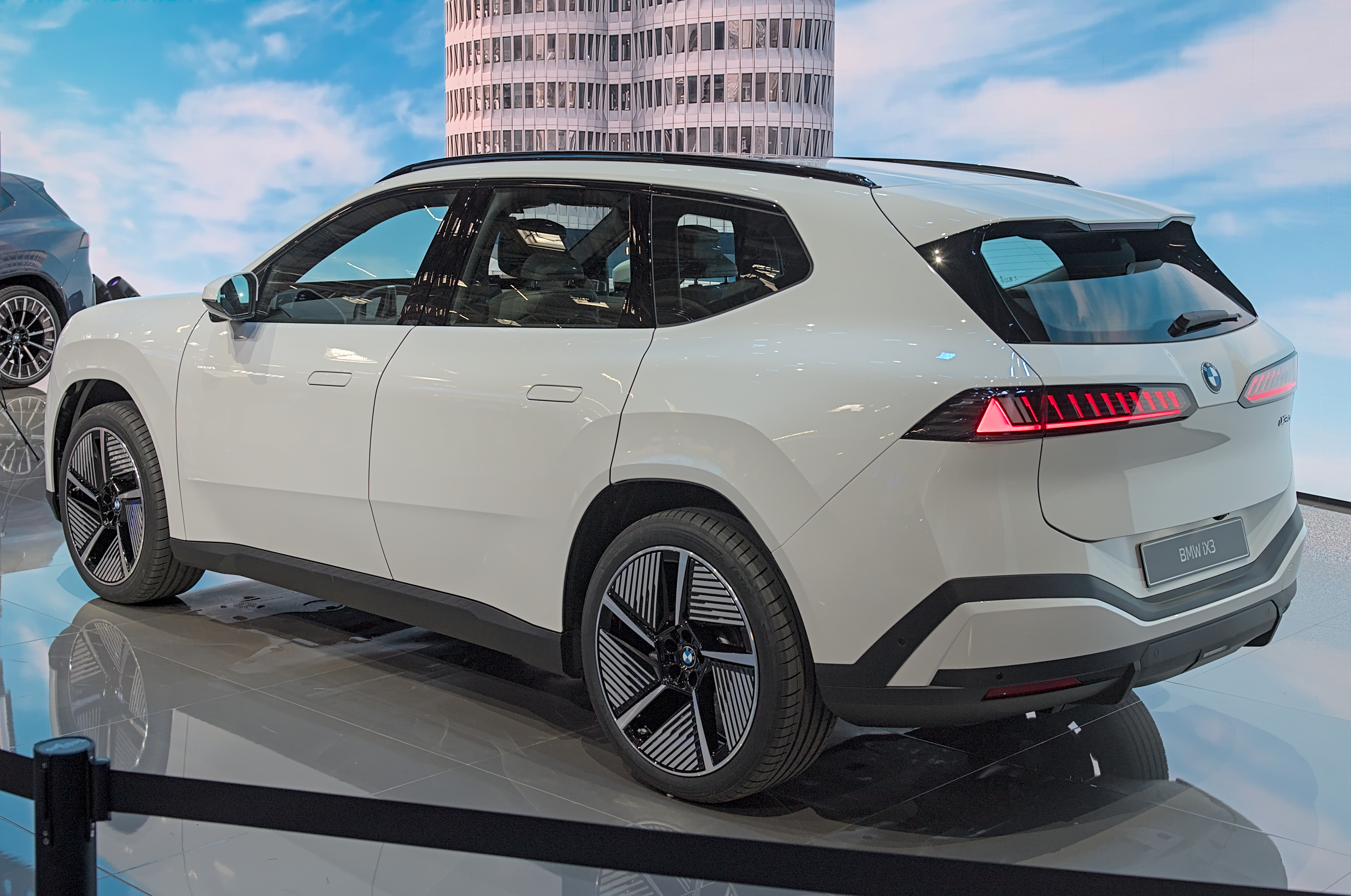
Rear view

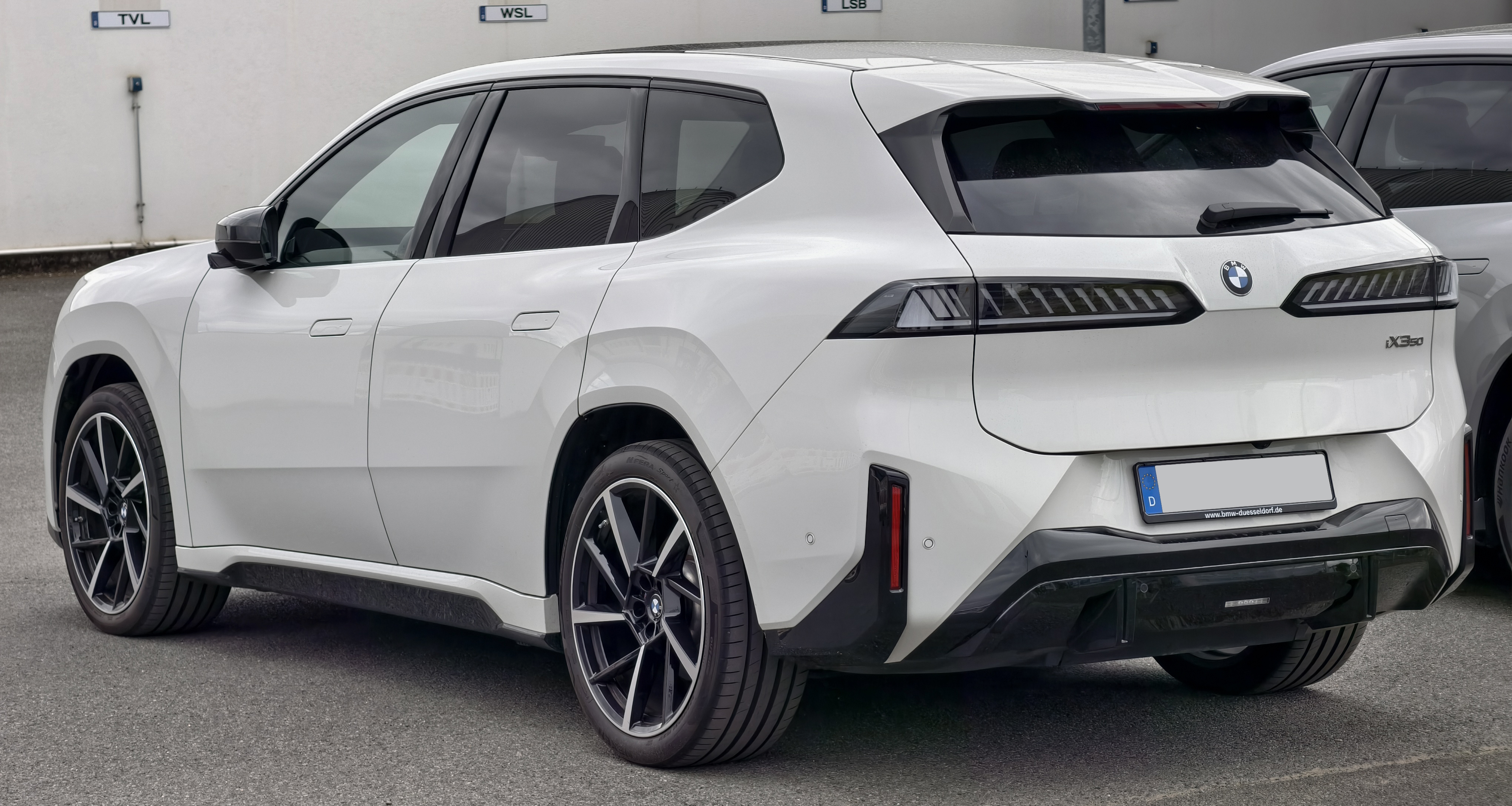
Rear view (M Sport)

Interior

== Specifications ==
=== Battery and charging ===
The iX3 is built on an 800-volt architecture. The iX3 50 xDrive features a 108 kWh (usable) NMC battery using 4695-format cylindrical cells in a module-free cell-to-pack format, offering up to 434 miles (698 km) of EPA range, 500 miles (800 km) of WLTP range and an energy efficiency of up to 4.1 miles/kWh. It is capable of DC fast charging up to 400 kW, going from 10% to 80% in 21 minutes and adding 231 miles (372 km) of range in 10 minutes. It also has V2H, V2G, and V2L bidirectional charging functions.

=== Powertrain ===
The iX3 50 xDrive has a dual-motor all-wheel drive layout producing 463 hp (345 kW) and 473 lb⋅ft (641 N⋅m) of torque, completing 0–100 km/h (0–62 mph) in 4.9 seconds. Part of the Neue Klasse platform are four digital "superbrains", where one dubbed the "Heart of Joy" is responsible for driving dynamics. The Heart of Joy controls every component of the car related to driving dynamics (drivetrain, brakes, regenerative braking and charging, steering) with no delegation to supplier-authored software running on supplier-sourced chip hardware, as was common in previous generations. As a result, it has a latency of 1 millisecond, cut down from the typical 10-50 milliseconds. BMW claims that the Heart of Joy was programmed so that 99% of braking can be handled via regenerative braking, and that it can micromanage the braking of each wheel to deliver a limousine stop.

== Safety ==
Euro NCAP test results BMW iX3 (2026)
Test	Score
Overall:	5 /5 stars
Safe driving	73%
Crash avoidance	83%
Crash protection	86%
Post crash	95%

ANCAP test results BMW iX3 (2026, aligned with Euro NCAP)
Test	Score
Overall:	5 /5 stars
Safe driving	71%
Crash avoidance	83%
Crash protection	86%
Post crash	95%

== Equipment and technology ==
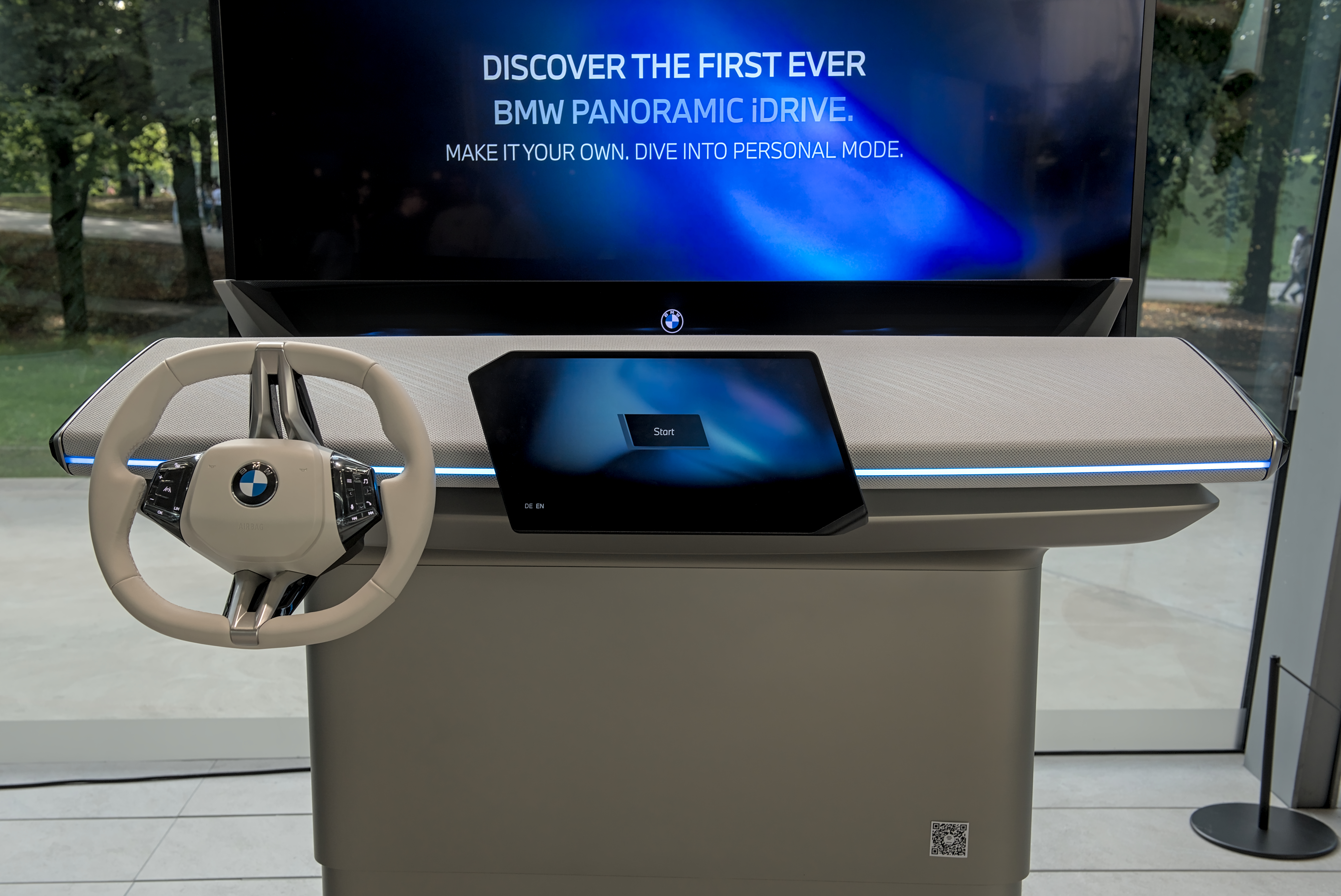
Panoramic iDrive

The BMW iX3 is the first vehicle in BMW's lineup to feature the Panoramic iDrive system, running on iDrive X. It features a "Panoramic Vision display" - a 43.3-inch side-to-side darkened area recessed within the hood where information is projected on. Users can customize the widgets and information that are featured in the panoramic vision display, such as the vehicle speed and the state of charge. This can also be supplemented by an optional 3D heads-up display that is projected above the panoramic display. A new 17.9-inch central display remains in the center of the dashboard, with a new shape slanted towards the driver.

In September 2025, BMW jointly developed an automated driving system with Qualcomm. The system will debut on the BMW iX3.

== Markets ==
=== China ===
The Chinese market exclusively receives a long-wheelbase version named the iX3 L (codenamed NA6), which was revealed before the Beijing Auto Show on 22 April 2026. The wheelbase has been lengthened by 107 mm (4.2 in) and the overall length increases by 103 mm (4.1 in). The exterior is similar to the global version, but the pop-out electronic door handles have been replaced by pocket style handles, which BMW says has triple redundancy with backup power from the high-voltage battery and a mechanical backup mechanism available from both the interior and exterior, in addition to the standard 12-volt accessory battery. Additionally, the rear window has an additional Hofmeister kink motif embedded using titanium dioxide stripes, and a rearview camera pod is located on the back of the roof for use with the digital rearview mirror.

The interior uses the same display setup and BMW OS X software, but integrates a custom Alibaba AI model and DeepSeek AI and is compatible with Huawei HiCar phone mirroring. According to BMW, the rear seats were fully developed by its team in Shanghai, and have 40 mm (1.6 in) longer cushions that are 20 mm (0.79 in) thicker than the global version. The rear seat backrests can recline up to 121 degrees. Additionally, the materials have been upgraded with additional exclusive upholstery options offered. The rear cargo area measures 540 L (19 cu ft) and expands to 1,900 L (67 cu ft) with the rear seats folded down, and is supplemented by a 58-litre (2.0 cu ft) frunk.

The iX3 L uses the Momenta R7 ADAS system and is capable of Highway NOA (Navigate-On-Autopilot). Its sensor suite consists of 5 mmWave radars, 7 cameras, and 12 ultrasonic sensors and is capable of Level 2 supervised autonomous driving in highway and urban conditions.

The iX3 L is offered with 3 powertrain options — the iX3 30L, iX3 40L xDrive and iX3 50L xDrive, the former two of which differ from international models.

iX3 50L

iX3 50L rear view

Interior

Specifications (China)
Models	Battery		Range	Charging			Drive	Motor		Peak output		0–100 km/h (62 mph)	Top speed	Kerb weight
Name	Type	Weight	CLTC	DC	10–80%	AC	Drive	Front	Rear	Power	Torque	0–100 km/h (62 mph)	Top speed	Kerb weight
iX3 30L	77 kWh LFP CATL	576.6 kg (1,271 lb)	630 km (391 mi)	TBD	22 min	7 kW	Rear	—	BMW HD1001N0 EESM	195 kW (261 hp)	500 N⋅m (369 ft⋅lb)	6.8 s	180 km/h (112 mph)	2,237 kg (4,932 lb)
iX3 40L xDrive	86.9 kWh NMC CATL	502.3 kg (1,107 lb)	702 km (436 mi)	300 kW	21 min	7 kW	All	ZF HF1002N0 induction	BMW HD1001N0 EESM	275 kW (369 hp)	565 N⋅m (417 ft⋅lb)	5.6 s	200 km/h (124 mph)	2,255 kg (4,971 lb)
iX3 50L xDrive	113.4 kWh NMC Eve Energy	602.7 kg (1,329 lb)	919 km (571 mi)	400 kW	21 min	11 kW	All	ZF HF1002N0 induction	BMW HD1001N0 EESM	345 kW (463 hp)	645 N⋅m (476 ft⋅lb)	4.9 s	210 km/h (130 mph)	2,357 kg (5,196 lb)

=== Thailand ===
BMW iX3 Release in Thailand with the 2 models the standard-wheelbase BMW iX3 50 xDrive M Sport (NA5) (launched earlier in 2026) Imported from Hungary and the newly announced long-wheelbase BMW iX3 40L xDrive M Sport (NA6) imported from China (debuting at Motor Expo 2026).
