= Dual ball joint suspension =

Type of automotive suspension design

A dual ball joint suspension uses a pair of simple links to replace a wishbone in a MacPherson or SLA suspension. The outer end of each arm terminates in a ball joint, hence the name.

== General description ==
The two links, the spindle, and the body, form a four-bar link. Use of the linkage at the lower suspension connection of either a MacPherson strut or a short long arms suspension readily gives an effective virtual ball joint outboard of the spindle, which is very useful for a suspension designer, allowing negative scrub radius whilst allowing the ball joints to be placed farther inboard and thus out of the way of the brakes. Some manufacturers use a double ball joint arm to replace both wishbones on a short long arms suspension. This provides further opportunity for optimising the geometry.

== Examples ==
It is used on large cars such as the Lexus LS 460, BMW X5, Ford Territory, Genesis GV60, and General Motors' Zeta-derived models.

== Disadvantages ==
The extra ball joint adds weight and cost. It also increases steering friction, and the parasitic friction in the suspension. The geometry has some undesirable characteristics that need careful management, such as returnability from full lock when parking.
