= BMW iX4 =

Battery electric compact luxury crossover SUV

Overview
- Manufacturer: BMW
- Model code: NA7
- Production: October 2026 – present
- Model years: 2027
- Assembly: Hungary: Debrecen

Body and chassis
- Class: Compact luxury crossover SUV
- Body style: 5-door coupe SUV
- Layout: Rear-motor, rear-wheel-drive (iX4 40); Dual-motor, all-wheel-drive (iX4 40 / 50 xDrive / iX4 M60 xDrive)
- Platform: Neue Klasse platform
- Related: BMW iX3 (NA5); BMW i3 (NA0)

Powertrain
- Electric motor: AC induction (front); Externally-excited synchronous (rear)
- Power output: 275–450 kW (374–612 PS; 369–603 hp)
- Battery: 87 kWh NMC; 113.4 kWh NMC
- Electric range: Up to 434 mi (698 km) (EPA); Up to 828 km (514 mi) (WLTP)
- Plug-in charging: DC:

Dimensions
- Wheelbase: 2,897 mm (114.1 in)
- Length: 4,782 mm (188.3 in)
- Width: 1,895 mm (74.6 in)
- Height: 1,595 mm (62.8 in)

Chronology
- Predecessor: BMW X4

The BMW iX4 is a battery electric compact luxury crossover SUV manufactured by BMW since late 2026. It is the coupé variant of the iX3 and the successor to the internal combustion engine-based X4.

== Overview ==
The iX4 was officially revealed on 8 October 2026.

== Powertrain ==
At launch, the iX4 is available with three powertrains shared with the iX3. The iX4 40 uses a single rear-mounted motor and a rear wheel drive drivetrain, producing 320 hp (240 kW) and 369 lb⋅ft (500 N⋅m) of torque. It has a 82.6 kWh (usable) NMC battery that provides up to 401 mi (645 km) of range.

Meanwhile, the iX4 50 xDrive and iX4 M60 xDrive both utilize a dual motor all wheel drive configuration and are equipped with a 112 kWh (usable) NMC battery that provides up to 428 mi (689 km) of range. The former produces 463 hp (345 kW) and 473 lb⋅ft (641 N⋅m) of torque, while the latter produces 603 hp (450 kW) and 645 lb⋅ft (875 N⋅m).
