= Double wishbone suspension =

Automotive independent suspension design

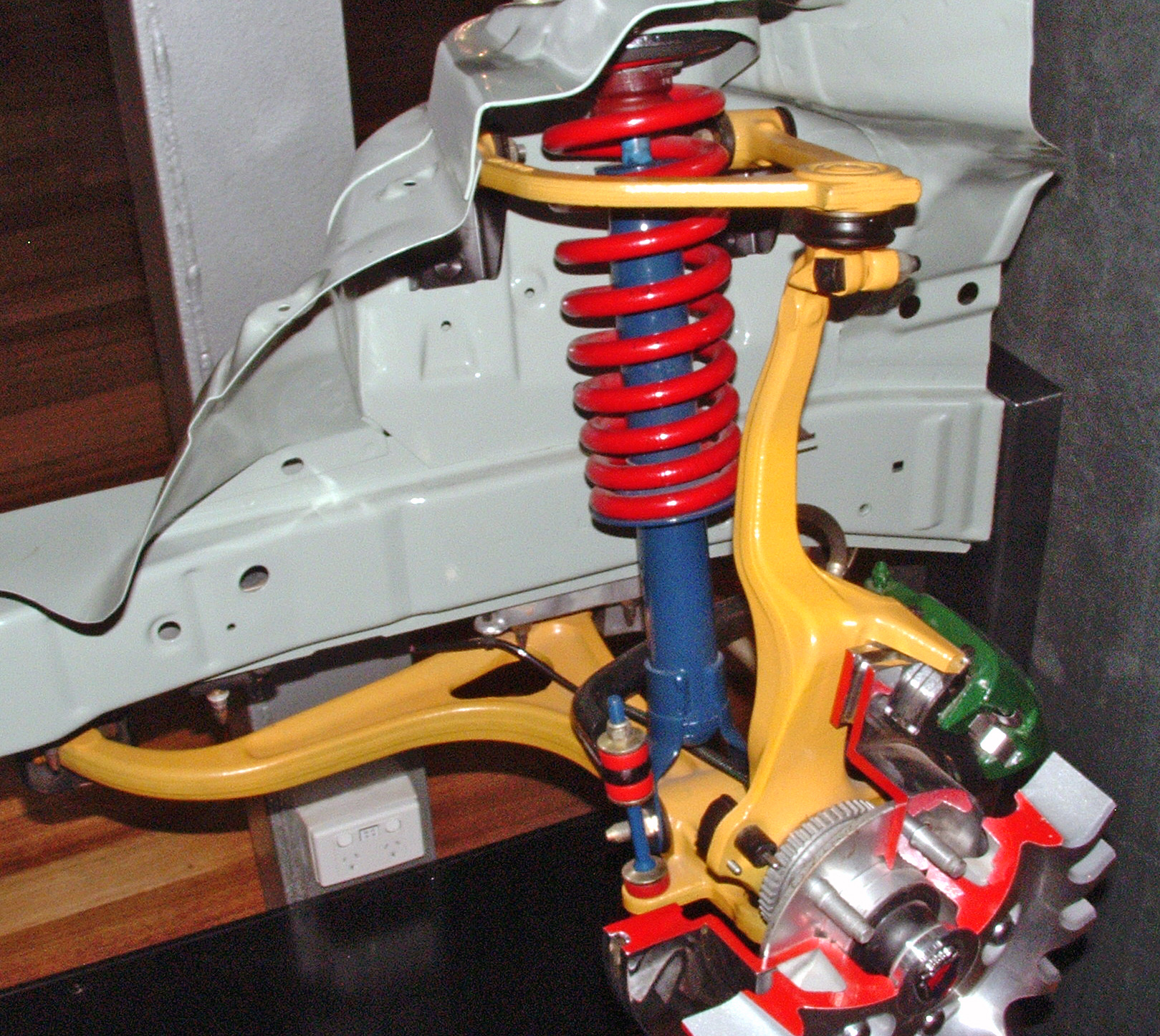
Wishbones and upright painted yellow

A double wishbone suspension is an independent suspension design for automobiles using two (occasionally parallel) wishbone-shaped arms to locate the wheel. Each wishbone or arm has two mounting points to the chassis and one joint at the knuckle. The shock absorber and coil spring mount to the wishbones to control vertical movement. Double wishbone designs allow the engineer to carefully control the motion of the wheel throughout suspension travel, controlling such parameters as camber angle, caster angle, toe pattern, roll center height, scrub radius, scuff (mechanical abrasion), and more.

== Implementation ==
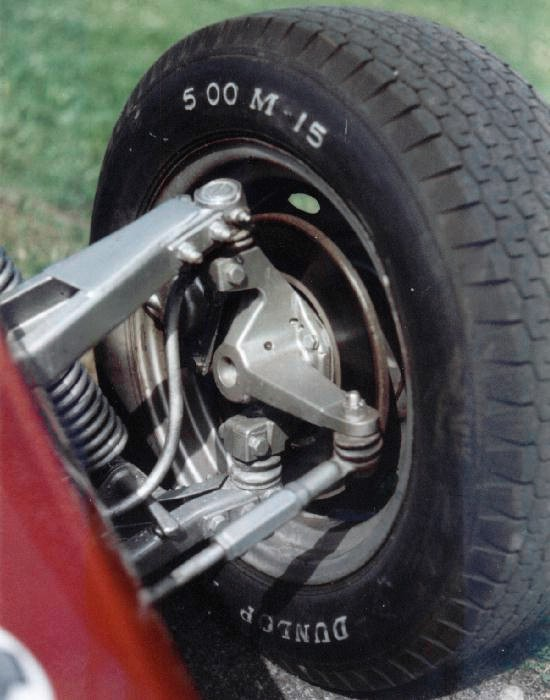
Double wishbone suspension (front) on a Saab Quantum IV

The double-wishbone suspension can also be referred to as "double A-arms", though the arms themselves can be A-shaped or L-shaped. A single wishbone or A-arm can also be used in various other suspension types, such as variations of the MacPherson strut. The upper arm is usually shorter to induce negative camber as the suspension jounces (rises), and often this arrangement is titled an "SLA" or "short, long arms" suspension. When the vehicle is in a turn, body roll results in positive camber gain on the lightly loaded inside wheel, while the heavily loaded outer wheel gains negative camber.

Between the outboard end of the arms is a knuckle. The knuckle contains a kingpin for horizontal radial movement in older designs, and rubber or trunnion bushings for vertical hinged movement. In newer designs, a ball joint at each end allows for all movement. Attached to the knuckle at its center is a bearing hub, or in many older designs, a spindle to which the wheel bearings are mounted.

To resist fore-aft loads such as acceleration and braking, the arms require two bushings or ball joints at the body.

Double wishbone suspension in action, displayed at the Toyota Museum in Nagoya, Japan

At the knuckle end, single ball joints are typically used, in which case the steering loads have to be taken via a steering arm, and the wishbones look A- or L-shaped. An L-shaped arm is generally preferred on passenger vehicles because it allows a better compromise of handling and comfort to be tuned in. The bushing in line with the wheel can be kept relatively stiff to effectively handle cornering loads while the off-line joint can be softer to allow the wheel to recess under fore-aft impact loads. For a rear suspension, a pair of joints can be used at both ends of the arm, making them more H-shaped in plan view. Alternatively, a fixed-length driveshaft can perform the function of a wishbone as long as the shape of the other wishbone provides control of the upright. This arrangement has been successfully used in the Jaguar IRS. In elevation view, the suspension is a 4-bar link, and it is easy to work out the camber gain (see camber angle) and other parameters for a given set of bushing or ball-joint locations. The various bushings or ball joints do not have to be on horizontal axes, parallel to the vehicle center line. If they are set at an angle, then anti-dive and anti-squat geometry can be dialed in.

In many racing cars, the springs and dampers are relocated inside the bodywork. The suspension uses a bellcrank to transfer the forces at the knuckle end of the suspension to the internal spring and damper. This is then known as a "push rod" if bump travel "pushes" on the rod (and subsequently the rod must be joined to the bottom of the upright and angled upward). As the wheel rises, the push rod compresses the internal spring via a pivot or pivoting system. The opposite arrangement, a "pull rod", will pull on the rod during bump travel, and the rod must be attached to the top of the upright, angled downward. Locating the spring and damper inboard increases the total mass of the suspension, but reduces the unsprung mass, and also allows the designer to make the suspension more aerodynamic.

=== Short long arms suspension ===
A short long arms suspension (SLA) is also known as an unequal-length double wishbone suspension. The upper arm is typically an A-arm and is shorter than the lower link, which is an A-arm or an L-arm, or sometimes a pair of tension/compression arms. In the latter case, the suspension can be called a multi-link, or dual-ball joint suspension.

The four-bar linkage mechanism formed by the unequal arm lengths causes a change in the camber of the vehicle as it rolls, which helps to keep the contact patch square on the ground, increasing the ultimate cornering capacity of the vehicle. It also reduces the wear on the outer edge of the tire.

SLAs can be classified as short spindle, in which the upper ball joint on the spindle is inside the wheel, or long spindle, in which the spindle tucks around the tire and the upper ball joint sits above the tire.

Short spindle SLAs tend to require stiffer bushings at the body, as the braking and cornering forces are higher. Also, they tend to have poorer kingpin geometry, due to the difficulty of packaging the upper ball joint and the brakes inside the wheel.

Long spindle SLAs tend to have better kingpin geometry, but the proximity of the spindle to the tire restricts fitting oversized tires or snow chains. The location of the upper balljoint may have styling implications in the design of the sheet metal above it.

SLAs require some care when setting up their bump steer characteristic, as it is easy to end up with excessive, or curved, bump steer curves.

== History ==
The double wishbone suspension was introduced in the 1930s. French car maker Citroën began using it in their 1934 Rosalie and Traction Avant models. Packard Motor Car Company of Detroit, Michigan, used it on the Packard One-Twenty from 1935,[1] and advertised it as a safety feature. During that time MacPherson strut was still in the area of aviation technology and was derived from aircraft landing mechanisms. Later on, in 1951, Ford Company decided to use the MacPherson strut on small production cars, the English Ford Consul and Ford Zephyr.[2] Thus, the double wishbone was applied early in automobile history and there is no genetic relationship between MacPherson strut and double wishbone suspension.

Double wishbones have traditionally been considered to have superior dynamic characteristics as well as load-handling capabilities and are therefore commonly found on sports cars and racing cars throughout automotive history. Examples of cars with double wishbone suspension include the Aston Martin DB7, the Mazda MX-5, and the third through eighth generation of the Honda Accord. Short long arms suspension, a type of double wishbone suspension, is very common on front suspensions for medium-to-large cars such as the Peugeot 407, Citroën C5, and the first two generations of the Mazda6/Atenza.

== Advantages ==
The double wishbone suspension provides the engineer with more design choices than some other types do. It is fairly easy to work out the effect of moving each joint, so the kinematics of the suspension can be tuned easily and wheel motion can be optimized. It is also easy to work out the loads that different parts will be subjected to which allows more optimized lightweight parts to be designed. They also provide increasing negative camber gain all the way to full jounce travel, unlike the MacPherson strut, which provides negative camber gain only at the beginning of jounce travel and then reverses into positive camber gain at high jounce amounts.

== Disadvantages ==
Double wishbone suspensions are more complex, impose more difficult packaging constraints, and are thus often more expensive than other systems like a MacPherson strut. Due to the increased number of components within the suspension setup, it takes much longer to service and is heavier than an equivalent MacPherson design. At the other end of the scale, it offers less design choice than the more costly and complex multi-link suspension system.

== See also ==
- Chapman strut
- Corvette leaf spring
- Dual ball joint suspension
- Leaf spring
- MacPherson strut
- Multi-link suspension
- Strut bar
- Torsion beam suspension
- Trailing-arm suspension
- Twin-Traction Beam
- Twist-beam rear suspension
- Weissach axle – a variant of Double wishbone suspension with a short link at the front pivot bushing of the lower A-arm
