= Sprint Cup =

Sprint Cup may refer to:

- Sprint Cup Series, an auto racing series in the United States
  - Sprint Cup (trophy), the trophy awarded to the winner of the Sprint Cup Series driver's championship
- Haydock Sprint Cup, a horse race in the United Kingdom
- Sprint Cup (Hong Kong), a horse race in Hong Kong

== See also ==
- Sprint race (disambiguation)
