= Bill France Cup =

NASCAR Cup Series trophy

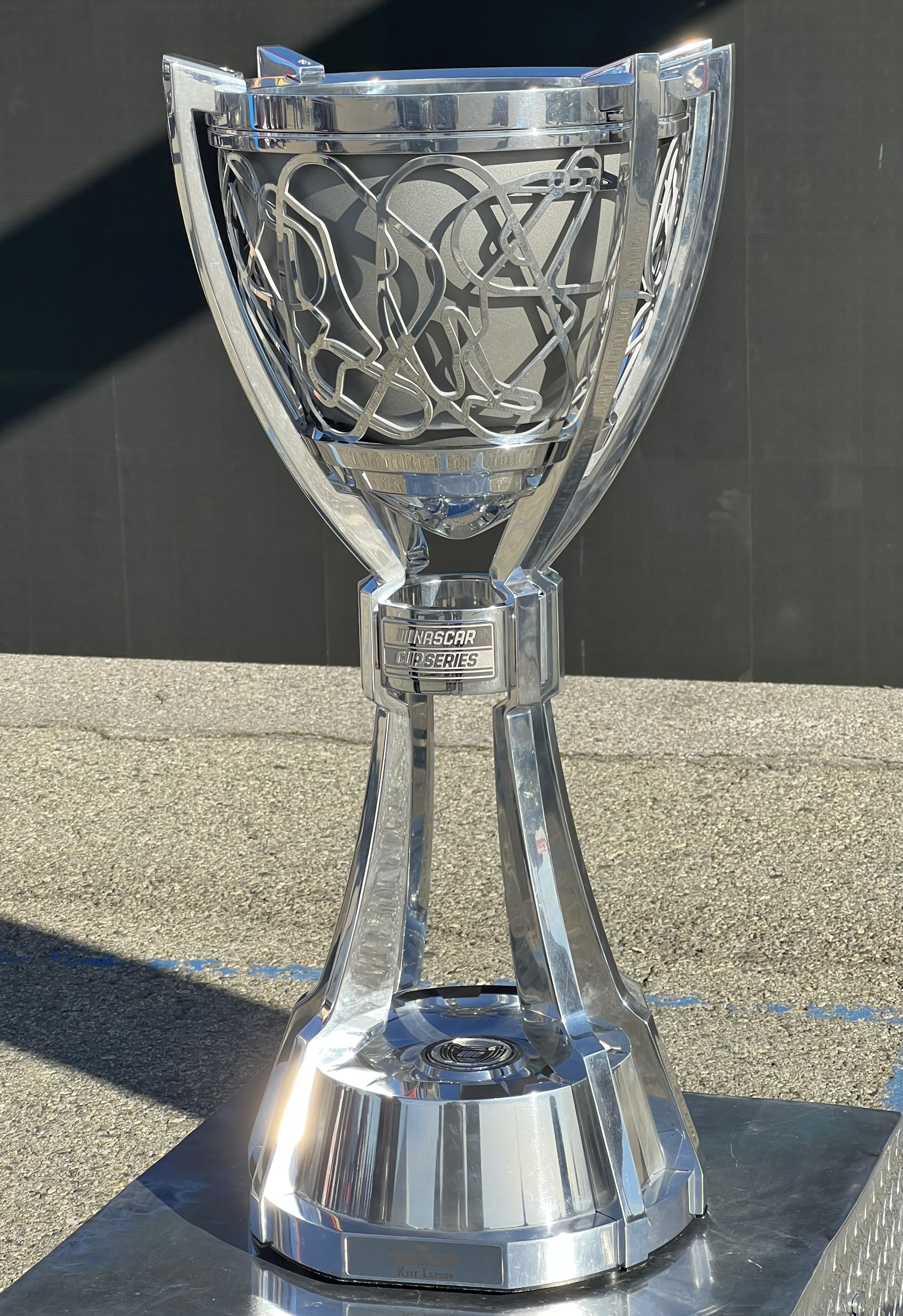
- The Bill France Cup in 2021
- Competition: NASCAR Cup Series
- Awarded for: Winner of the NASCAR Chase
- Country: United States

History
- First award: 2017
- Most recent: Kyle Larson

The Bill France Cup is the trophy awarded to the NASCAR Cup Series champion, who is the driver to record the most points in the ten-race NASCAR Chase.

The trophy was introduced in 2017 as the Monster Energy NASCAR Cup. When Monster Energy's sponsorship of the Cup Series ended after 2019, it was renamed in honor of NASCAR founder Bill France Sr.

== Design ==
The trophy was created by Jostens across 300 hours of manufacturing. Curt Bruns, the vice president of Jostens' motorsports division, explained upon its reveal that the company hoped to "capture the full championship story that unfolds over the course of a season."

Made from machined aluminum, it is 37 inches (0.94 m) tall and weighs 68 pounds (31 kg). The chalice could hold approximately 600 ounces (17 kg) of liquid.

Outlines of every track on the Cup Series schedule is engraved into the chalice, and is updated annually to account for changes. Inaccuracies have occasionally appeared, such as the map of Watkins Glen International using the full course with the "Boot" rather than the shorter version that NASCAR races on.

On the center is a ring depicting the series logo. During Monster Energy's sponsorship, the energy drink's claw logo was embedded on the base.

The design would later inspire the trophies given to the NASCAR Euro Series' class champions, both produced by Tijey. The EuroNASCAR 2 trophy is smaller than its EuroNASCAR PRO counterpart and lacks the track engravings.

== History ==
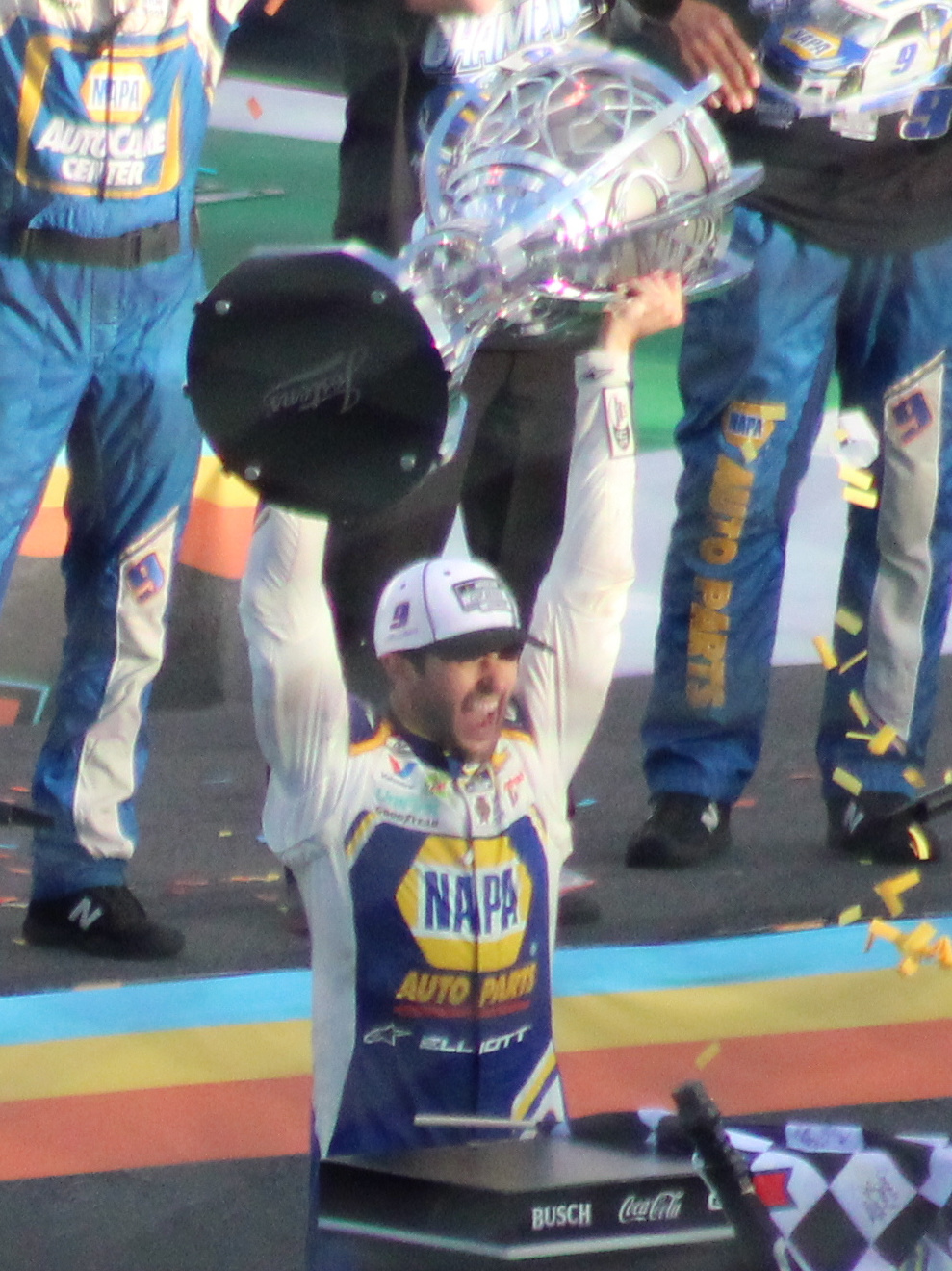
Chase Elliott lifting the Bill France Cup as the 2020 NASCAR Cup Series champion

NASCAR typically debuted a new trophy when the Cup Series changed title sponsor, but the Bill France Cup was intended to be a permanent fixture regardless of who held the naming rights.

After the NASCAR Winston Cup Series era ended in 2003, a new trophy was introduced to commemorate incoming sponsor Nextel and its successor Sprint Corporation. The Nextel and Sprint Cup was designed to resemble flags, a departure from the chalices on the Winston-era trophy.

Monster Energy became the title sponsor in 2017, while the trophy was revealed on August 31 ahead of the playoffs. It was simply referred to as the "Monster Energy NASCAR Cup" on reveal. The chalice design from the Winston Cup period was restored; journalist Matt Weaver quipped, "It's actually a cup again..."

Although Monster's sponsorship ended after 2019, NASCAR opted to retain the trophy design while renaming it to the Bill France Cup. NASCAR CEO Jim France proclaimed it "fitting that my father's name is associated with the highest mark of excellence in our sport." Despite the similar names, it is not to be confused with the Bill France Performance Cup awarded to the manufacturers' champion of the NASCAR O'Reilly Auto Parts Series.
