= Daytona 500 Experience =

Former NASCAR museum

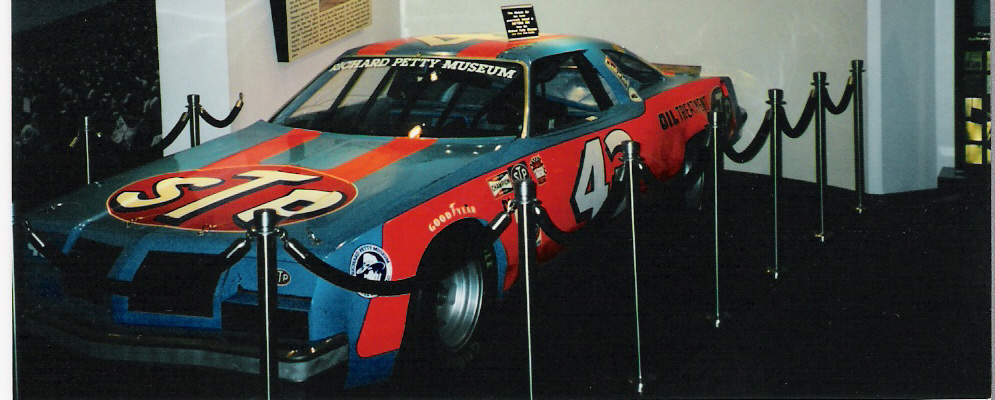
- Replica of Richard Petty's Pontiac Grand Prix, in which he won the 1979 Daytona 500

- Location within Volusia County
- Established: 1996
- Location: Daytona Beach, Florida
- Coordinates: 29.1918°N 81.07°W
- Public transit access: VOTRAN

The Daytona 500 Experience, formerly known as Daytona USA, was an interactive motorsports attraction and museum located at Daytona International Speedway in Daytona Beach, Florida. Intrinsically linked to the Daytona 500, the museum primarily focused on exhibits related to NASCAR. The attraction also included exhibits related to the Daytona 200 motorcycle race, the 24 Hours of Daytona, as well as the Daytona Beach & Road Course.

The attraction opened in 1996. In 2005, the site was one of the finalists to host the NASCAR Hall of Fame. After losing the hall of fame bid, due to high operating costs and low attendance, parent company International Speedway Corporation announced on November 6, 2010 that the attraction would no longer be open to the public but would be available only for private functions.

After being closed to the public for four years, it was announced in 2014 that the Motorsports Hall of Fame of America would relocate to the site. The new expanded and refurbished museum opened in February 2017.

== History ==
Through 1995, Daytona International Speedway featured a modest two-story visitors’ center outside of the oval's fourth turn. The first floor of the visitors' center housed the ticket office and a small sampling of racing memorabilia; the second floor was home to a wall of photographs of previous Daytona 500 winners. The Speedway also offered track tours on open-air trams.

In mid- to late-1995, the visitors center was closed and a new destination-style, interactive museum was designed to take its place. The attraction opened in July 1996 during the 1996 Pepsi 400 using the name Daytona USA. (It should not be confused with the arcade game of the same name, though the game is featured in the attraction's arcade.) The attraction was awarded the Themed Entertainment Association's Thea Award of Outstanding Achievement in September 1997.

The attraction was expanded by 10,000 sq ft (930 m^{2}) in July 2001. The renovation added two motion simulators: an IWERKS motion simulator ride called Daytona Dream Laps and the full-motion simulator Acceleration Alley. A third simulator, Toyota Tundra's Thunder Road, was added in 2003. Daytona USA celebrated its tenth anniversary in 2006 by adding the Daytona 500 Champion's Walk of Fame to the walkway in front of the building. On July 1, 2007, Daytona USA was renamed the Daytona 500 Experience.

== Exhibits ==
The 60,000 sq ft (5,600 m^{2}) attraction boasted several exhibit areas, simulators and interactive displays. Some of these remain active for private functions, however the IMAX presentation will no longer be shown.

- The Coca-Cola IMAX Theater, home to NASCAR 3D: The IMAX Experience, a full-length 3D feature film released in 2004. During special events the theater was also used to show other movies: during Speedweeks 2007, the theater showed Dale, a movie about the life of NASCAR driver Dale Earnhardt, and the theater showed 24x24: Wide Open With Jeff Gordon in July 2007.
- Acceleration Alley, a Full Motion Racing Simulator where guests sit in 80%-scale models of NASCAR stockcars and race against other guests and AI computer competitors.
- Dream Laps, an Iwerks motion simulator in which guests follow the events of a NASCAR raceday.
- Chevy 16-Second Pit Stop Challenge, where guests are able to test their skills as a pit crew member and compete with the Daytona 500 Experience's own Pit Crew, who practice daily.
- Goodyear Heritage Museum, which focuses on the people who have raced at Daytona Beach from the land speed record holders to stockcars racing at the Daytona Beach Road Course to stockcars racing at Daytona International Speedway.

The Champion's Walk of Fame, a Hollywood-esque concrete walk paying homage to winners of the Daytona 500 since the attraction opened in 1996, is just outside the building, as are statues of NASCAR great Dale Earnhardt and NASCAR founder Bill France Jr. and his wife Anne. Also on display inside the attraction are the NASCAR championship trophy and the Harley J. Earl Trophy, which is awarded to the winner of the Daytona 500.

The Daytona 500 Experience also once housed an arcade that featured many racing-themed arcade games, one of which was Sega's wildly popular Daytona USA, with which the attraction formerly shared its name with.

The Daytona 500 Experience also hosted fan forums during race time and was home to the Richard Petty Driving Experience from April through October. During Bike Week and Biketoberfest, the Daytona 500 Experience was transformed into D5X, an air conditioned haven for bikers featuring live bands, food and motorcycle exhibits.

The two different speedway tours that the attraction featured are still offered by the speedway with some modifications: the 30-minute general admission tour and a new, 60-minute All-Access tour that is available to the public for a higher fee and covers more ground.

== Daytona 500 connection ==
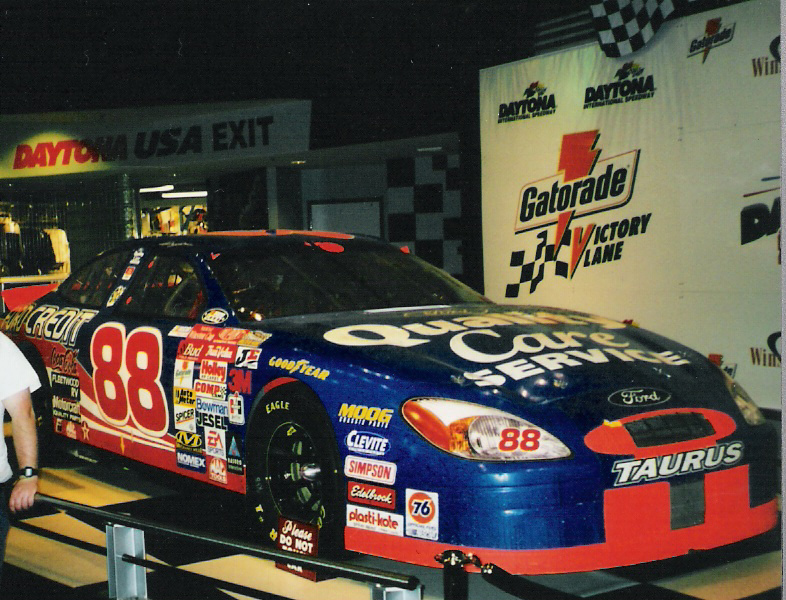
Dale Jarrett's 2000 Daytona 500 winning car on display at Daytona 500 Experience, taken January 2001

Since 1997, the winning car from the Daytona 500 is impounded and displayed for the next twelve months at the Daytona 500 Experience.

All winners are contractually required to surrender their winning car and all its parts, in uncleaned, complete, and unaltered condition, as explicitly specified on the race entry form. This practice is often criticized by participants because it prevents the team from driving the car (clearly a successful chassis) in the other races during the season. They argued it potentially put them at a competitive disadvantage during the rest of the NASCAR season, most notably at the other restrictor plate races. Only twice since this display arrangement was adopted in 1997 was the winner of the Daytona 500 able to take a different car, as required, and gone on to win the next restrictor plate race (Talladega): Jeff Gordon in 2005 and Jimmie Johnson in 2006. By the time the car is returned, approximately 364 days after the victory, it is usually considered obsolete and a write-off.

The morning after the race the winning car is inducted into the museum during the Champion's Breakfast ceremony. In some years, the driver's helmet, driving suit, or other race-used paraphernalia are also included for display. The driver also has the honor of unveiling the logo for next year's Daytona 500.
