= NASCAR Cup Series =

Top national division auto racing division within NASCAR

- NASCAR Cup Series logo 2020–present
- Category: Stock cars
- Country: United States
- Inaugural season: 1949
- Manufacturers: Chevrolet · Ford · Toyota · Dodge
- Engine suppliers: Chevrolet · Ford · Toyota
- Tire suppliers: Goodyear
- Drivers' champion: Kyle Larson
- Makes' champion: Toyota
- Teams' champion: Hendrick Motorsports
- Official website: NASCAR Cup Series

The NASCAR Cup Series is the top racing series of the National Association for Stock Car Auto Racing (NASCAR), the most prestigious stock car racing series in the United States.

The series began in 1949 as the Strictly Stock Division, and from 1950 to 1970 it was known as the Grand National Division. In 1971, when the series began leasing its naming rights to the R. J. Reynolds Tobacco Company, it was referred to as the NASCAR Winston Cup Series (1971–2003). A similar deal was made with Nextel in 2003, and it became the NASCAR Nextel Cup Series (2004–2007). Sprint acquired Nextel in 2005, and in 2008 the series was renamed the NASCAR Sprint Cup Series (2008–2016). In December 2016, it was announced that Monster Energy would become the new title sponsor, and the series was renamed the Monster Energy NASCAR Cup Series (2017–2019). In 2019, NASCAR rejected Monster's offer to extend the naming rights deal beyond the end of the season. NASCAR subsequently announced its move to a new tiered sponsorship model beginning with the 2020 season similar to other U.S. based professional sports leagues, where it was simply known as the NASCAR Cup Series, with the sponsors of the series being called Premier Partners. The four Premier Partners are Busch Beer, Coca-Cola, Xfinity, and Freeway Insurance.

The championship is determined by a points system, with points being awarded according to finish placement in the race and its stages. The season is divided into two segments. After the first 26 races (the regular season), 16 drivers are seeded based on their position in the points standings. They compete in the last ten races, where the difference in points is greatly minimized. This is called the NASCAR Chase.

The series holds strong roots in the Southeastern United States, with about half of the races in the 36-race season being held in that region. As of 2020, the schedule includes tracks from around the United States. There have been races held outside the United States with exhibition races previously held in Japan and Australia, and races held in Montreal and Mexico City. The Daytona 500, the most prestigious race, had a television audience of about 9.17 million U.S. viewers in 2019.

== History ==
=== Strictly Stock and Grand National ===
In 1949, NASCAR introduced the Strictly Stock division, after sanctioning Modified and Roadster division races in 1948. Eight races were run on seven dirt ovals and on the Daytona Beach beach/street course.

The first NASCAR "Strictly Stock" race was held at Charlotte Speedway on June 19, 1949. Jim Roper was declared the winner of that race after Glenn Dunaway was disqualified for having altered the rear springs on his car; the first series champion was Red Byron. The division was renamed "Grand National" for the 1950 season, reflecting NASCAR's intent to make the sport more professional and prestigious. It retained this name until 1971. The 1949 Strictly Stock season is regarded in NASCAR's record books as the first season of GN/Cup history. Martinsville Speedway is the only track on the 1949 schedule that remains on the current schedule.

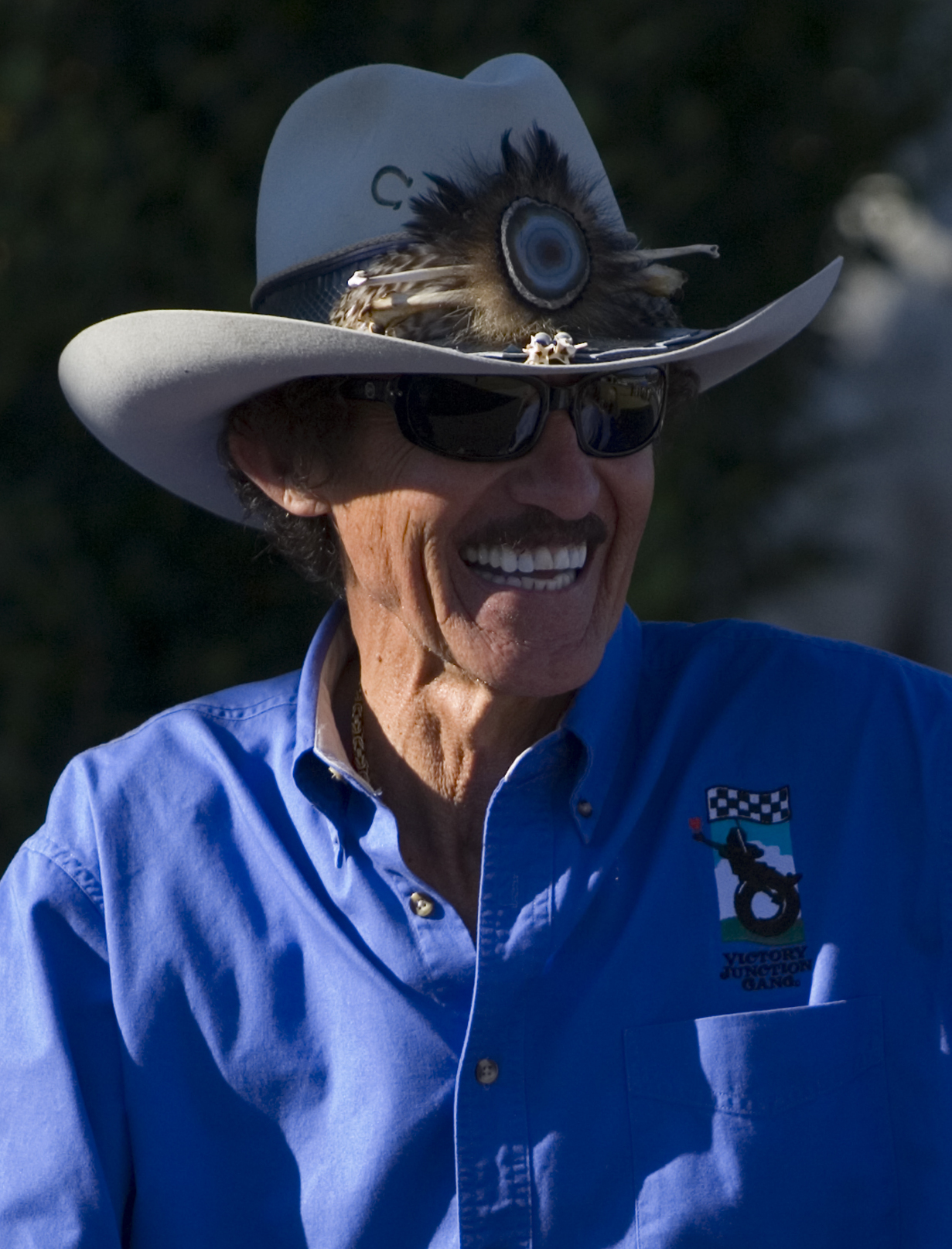
Seven-time Winston Cup champion Richard Petty

Rather than having a fixed schedule of one race per weekend with most entrants appearing at every event, the Grand National schedule has included over sixty events in some years. Often there were two or three races on the same weekend and occasionally two races on the same day in different states.

In the early years, most Grand National races were held on dirt-surfaced short oval tracks that ranged in lap length from under a quarter mile to over a half mile, or on dirt fairgrounds ovals usually ranging from a half mile to a mile in lap length. Of the first 221 Grand National races, 198 were run on dirt tracks. Darlington Raceway, opened in 1950, was the first completely paved track on the circuit over one mile (1.6 km) long. In 1959, when Daytona International Speedway was opened, the schedule still had more races on dirt racetracks than on paved ones. In the 1960s as superspeedways were built and old dirt tracks were paved, the number of races run on dirt tracks was reduced.

The last NASCAR Grand National race on a dirt track (until 2021) was held on September 30, 1970, at the half mile State Fairgrounds Speedway in Raleigh, North Carolina. Richard Petty won that race in a Plymouth that had been sold by Petty Enterprises to Don Robertson and rented back by Petty Enterprises for the race.

=== Winston Cup ===
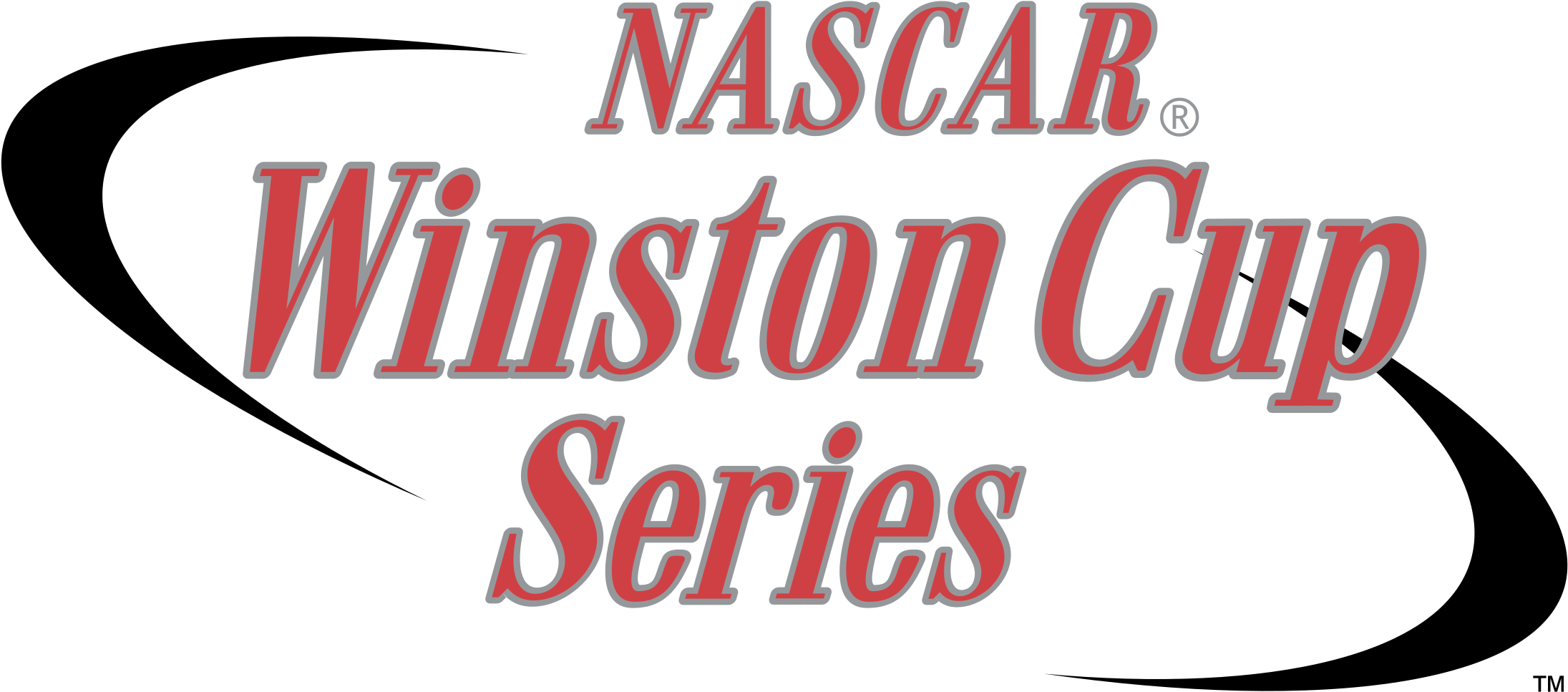
The Winston Cup Series logo from 2000 to 2003

Between 1971 and 2003, NASCAR's premier series was sponsored by R. J. Reynolds Tobacco Company cigarette brand Winston, dubbing it the Winston Cup Series. The series was originally called the Winston Cup Grand National Series before "Grand National" was dropped in 1986. In 1971, the Public Health Cigarette Smoking Act banned television advertising of cigarettes. As a result, tobacco companies began to sponsor sporting events as a way to spend their excess advertising dollars and to circumvent the ban. RJR's sponsorship became more controversial in the wake of the 1998 Tobacco Industry Settlement that sharply restricted avenues for tobacco advertising, including sports sponsorships.

The changes that resulted from RJR's involvement in the series as well as from the reduction in schedule from 48 to 31 races per year established 1972 as the beginning of NASCAR's "modern era". The season was made shorter, and the points system was modified several times during the next four years. Races on dirt tracks and on oval tracks shorter than 250 miles (400 kilometres) were removed from the schedule and transferred to the short-lived NASCAR Grand National East Series, and the remaining races had a minimum prize money of $30,000. NASCAR's founder, Bill France Sr., turned over control of NASCAR to his oldest son, Bill France Jr. In August 1974, France Jr. asked series publicist Bob Latford to design a points system with equal points being awarded for all races regardless of length or prize money. This system ensured that the top drivers would have to compete in all the races in order to become the series champion. This system remained unchanged from 1975 until the Chase for the Championship was instituted in 2004.

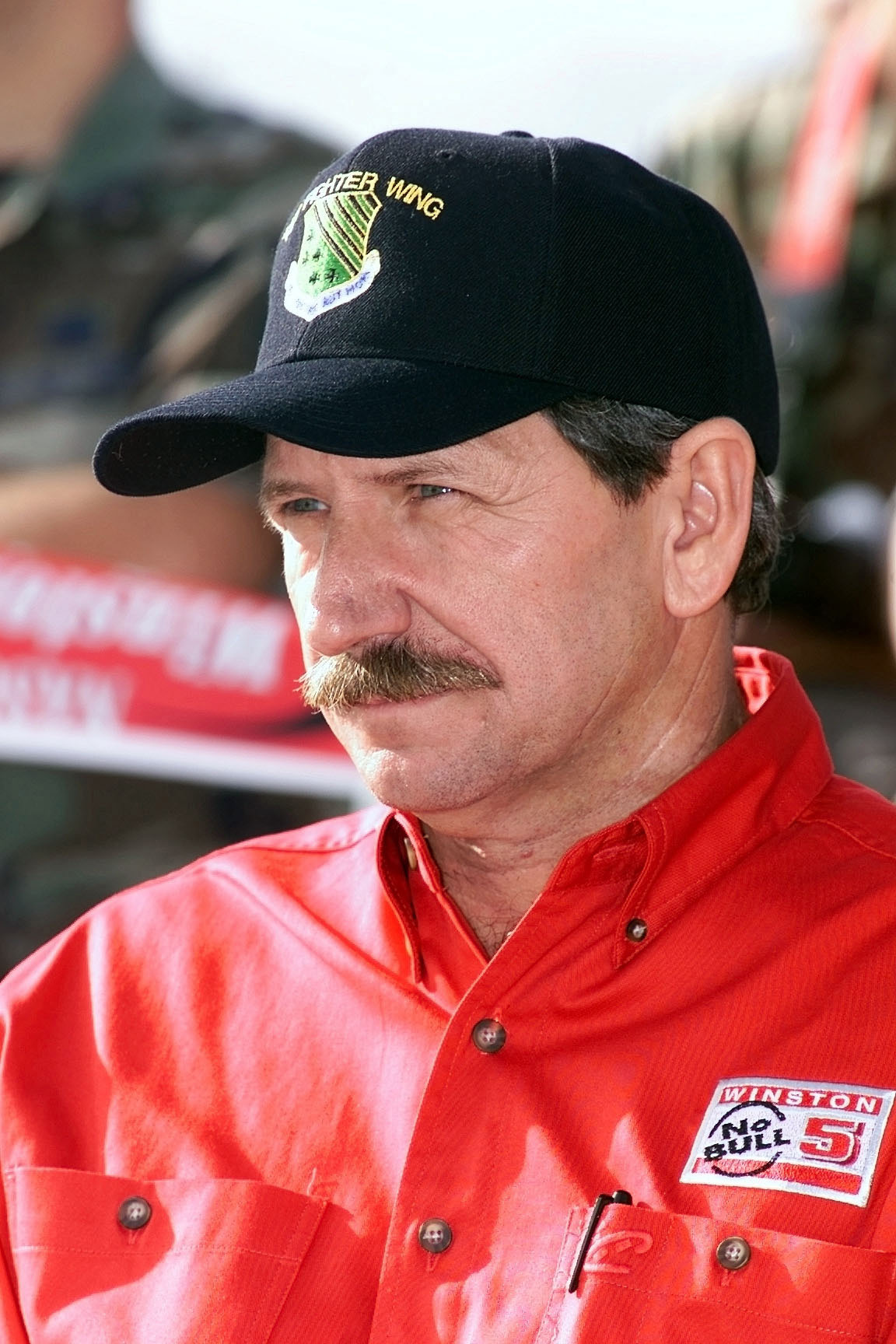
Seven-time Winston Cup champion Dale Earnhardt

Since 1982, the Daytona 500 has been the first non-exhibition race of the year.

ABC Sports aired partial or full live telecasts of Grand National races from Talladega, North Wilkesboro, Darlington, Charlotte, and Nashville in 1970. Because these events were perceived as less exciting than many Grand National races, ABC abandoned its live coverage. Races were instead broadcast, delayed and edited, on the ABC sports variety show Wide World of Sports.

In 1979, the Daytona 500 became the first stock car race that was nationally televised live from flag to flag on CBS. The leaders going into the last lap, Cale Yarborough and Donnie Allison, wrecked on the backstretch while dicing for the lead, allowing Petty to pass them both for the win. Immediately, Yarborough, Allison, and Allison's brother Bobby were engaged in a fistfight on national television. This underlined the drama and emotion of the sport and increased its broadcast marketability. The race coincided with a major snowstorm along the United States' eastern seaboard, successfully introducing the sport to a captive audience.

In 1981, an awards banquet began to be held in New York City on the first Friday evening in December. The first banquets were held in the Waldorf-Astoria's Starlight Room and in 1985 were moved to the much larger Grand Ballroom. For 2001, the banquet portion was dropped in favor of a simpler awards ceremony, which was also moved to the Hammerstein Ballroom at the Manhattan Center the following year. However, in 2003, the festivities returned to the Waldorf's Grand Ballroom, and the banquet format was reinstated.

In 1985, Winston introduced a new awards program called the Winston Million. From 1985 to 1997, any driver who won three of the four most prestigious races in the series was given one million dollars. The prize was only won twice; Bill Elliott won in 1985, Darrell Waltrip nearly won in 1989, Davey Allison nearly won in 1992, Dale Jarrett nearly won in 1996, and Jeff Gordon won in 1997. The Winston Million was replaced with a similar program, the Winston No Bull Five, in 1998. This program awarded one million dollars to any driver who won a prestigious race after finishing in the top five of the most previous prestigious races.

The series underwent a large boom in popularity in the 1990s. In 1994, NASCAR held the first Brickyard 400 at Indianapolis Motor Speedway. Between 1997 and 1998, the winner's prize money for the Daytona 500 tripled. This coincided with a decline of popularity in American Championship Car Racing.

In 1999, NASCAR made a new agreement with Fox Broadcasting, Turner Broadcasting, and NBC. The contract, signed for eight years for Fox and six years for NBC and Turner, was valued at $2.4 billion.

In 2001, Pixar visited NASCAR tracks as research for the 2006 animated film Cars, which included the voices of Petty and Dale Earnhardt Jr. To avoid advertising tobacco in a Disney film, "Piston Cup" served as Pixar's allusion to the Winston Cup (however, by the time the film came out, Nextel had replaced Winston as the series title sponsor).

=== Nextel and Sprint ===
The Nextel Cup Series logo from 2004 to 2007

During the 2002 season, R.J. Reynolds notified NASCAR leadership that they would terminate their title sponsorship prematurely at the conclusion of the 2003 season. NASCAR negotiated a contract with Nextel, a telecommunications company to replace Winston, and in 2004 the series became known as the Nextel Cup Series.

The 2006 merger between Sprint and Nextel resulted in the Cup Series being renamed the Sprint Cup, beginning with the 2008 season.

The Sprint Cup trophy was designed by Tiffany & Co. and is silver, with a pair of checkered flags in flight.

By 2009, the popularity boom of the 1990s had ended, and television ratings over the previous ten years had become more or less stagnant. Some long-time fans have criticized the series for losing its traditional appeal because of abandoning venues in the southeastern United States in favor of newer markets. They have also voiced discontent over Toyota's presence in the series. Japanese telecommunications corporation SoftBank acquired Sprint in July 2013. While NASCAR was suspicious of diversity promotion and aware of the negative implications of the redneck image, it also recognized the opportunities to expand the sport. NASCAR's CEO Brian France has become a prime target for criticism among fans during his tenure from 2003 to 2018.

In 2016, NASCAR announced the creation of a charter system (in association with the Race Team Alliance, formed in 2014), which would guarantee 36 teams' entry to all 36 races. Eligibility for a charter would depend on a team's attempts to qualify for every race within the previous three seasons. In conjunction with this rule, NASCAR also reduced the size of the Cup field to 40 cars.

The Sprint Cup Series logo from 2008 to 2016

==== Chase for the Cup ====
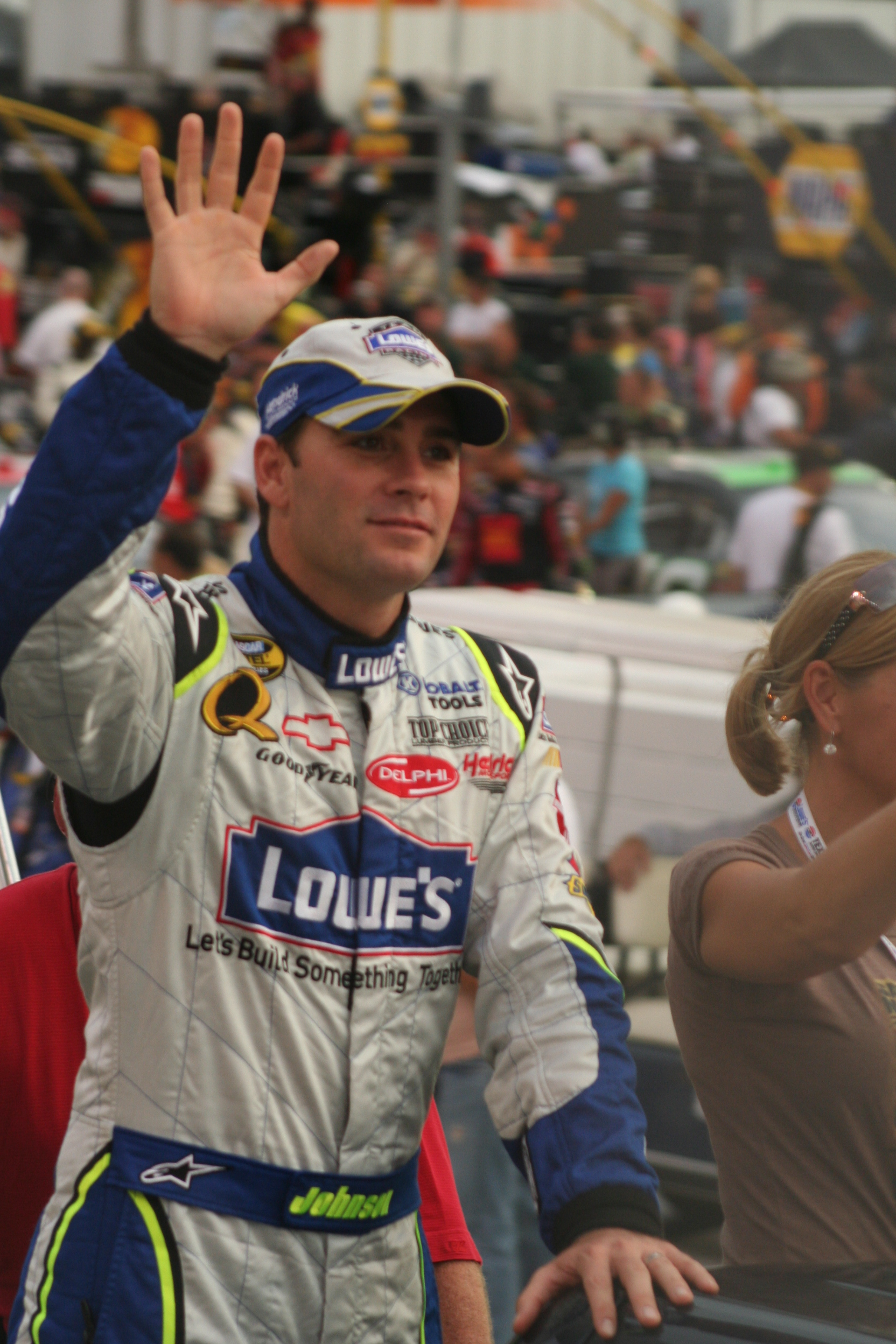
Seven-time NASCAR Cup Series champion, Jimmie Johnson

Along with the change in title sponsorship for the series, the 2004 season also introduced a new system for determining the series champion, influenced by the system used in the USAR Hooters Pro Cup Series.

Originally known as the Chase for the Nextel Cup (or simply "The Chase", and later changed to Sprint branding), the ten highest-scoring drivers and teams (plus ties) in the first 26 races of the season became eligible to win the championship by competing in a playoff held within the final ten races. This number was increased to 12 teams in 2007. The Chase participants had their points increased to a level mathematically unattainable by anyone outside this field (roughly 1,800 points ahead of the first driver outside the Chase). From the inaugural Chase in 2004 to the 2006 Chase, the drivers were seeded based on points position at the end of the regular season, with first place starting with 5,050 points and tenth place starting with 5,005. From 2007 to 2010, the points totals of each driver who made the Chase were reset to 5,000 points, plus ten additional points for each race victory during the first 26 races. Points would still be awarded as usual during the affected races. The driver leading in points after the 36th race would be declared the champion.

As part of a major change in the points system that took effect in 2011, the qualifying criteria and the points reset were changed as well. From 2011 to 2013, the ten drivers with the most points automatically qualified for the Chase. They were joined by two "wild card" qualifiers, specifically, the two drivers with the most race wins who were ranked between 11th and 20th in drivers' points. Their base point totals were then reset to 2,000 points, a level more than 1,000 points higher than that of the first driver outside the Chase. (Under the new point system, a race winner can earn a maximum of 48 points, as opposed to 195 in the pre-2011 system.) The ten automatic qualifiers received a bonus of three points for each win during the regular season, while the two wild card qualifiers received no such bonus. As in the past, the race layouts for the remaining ten races were the same, with no changes to the scoring system. On November 20, 2011, Tony Stewart and Carl Edwards ended the season in a first-ever points tie. Stewart's five season wins (all in the Chase) over Edwards' one win (in the third race of the season) gave Stewart the tiebreaker. Hence, he was named the winner of the 2011 NASCAR Cup Series Championship.

For 2014, NASCAR announced wide-ranging changes to the Chase format:

- The group of drivers in the Chase officially became the NASCAR Sprint Cup Chase Grid.
- The number of drivers qualifying for the Chase Grid ranges from 12 to 16.
- 15 of the 16 spots in the Chase Grid are reserved for the drivers with the most race wins over the first 26 races. The remaining spot is reserved for the points leader after 26 races, but only if that driver does not have a victory. If fewer than 16 drivers have wins in the first 26 races, the remaining Chase Grid spots are filled by winless drivers in order of points earned due that season. All drivers on the Chase Grid continue to have their driver points reset to 2,000 before the Chase, with a three-point bonus for each win in the first 26 races.
- The Chase is now divided into four rounds. After each of the first three rounds, the four Chase Grid drivers with the fewest points for the season are eliminated from the Grid and from Championship contention. Any driver on the Grid who wins a race in the first three rounds automatically advances to the next round. All drivers eliminated from the Chase have their points readjusted back to the points they started with at the beginning of the Round of 16, (race 27) plus any points earned after, using the regular season points scheme only (no Round of 12, or Round of Eight reset points). In 2016, the Chase for the Championship, formerly known as the Challenger, Contender, and Eliminator round, were changed to a Round of 16, Round of 12, and Round of 8.
  - Round of 16 (Races 27–29)
    - Begins with 16 drivers, each with 2,000 points, plus a 3-point bonus for each win in the first 26 races
  - Round of 12 (Races 30–32)
    - Begins with 12 drivers, each with 3,000 points
  - Round of 8 (Races 33–35)
    - Begins with eight drivers, each with 4,000 points
  - Championship 4 (final race)
    - The last four drivers in contention for the season title start the race with 5,000 points, with the highest finisher in the race winning the Cup Series title. No bonus points are awarded for laps led or most laps led for these four drivers. If one of the Championship Four drivers wins the race, the maximum points they can get is 40.

To encourage continued competition among all drivers, a number of awards are given to drivers finishing outside the Chase. The highest finishing non-Chase driver (13th place at the end of the season from 2007 to 2013 and potentially anywhere from fifth to 17th place starting in 2014) is awarded a bonus of approximately one million dollars and was originally given a position on stage at the post-season awards banquet. The awards banquet now focuses solely on the Chase, with all of the series' sponsored and contingency awards moved to a luncheon at Cipriani the day before the banquet.

This playoff system was implemented primarily to make the points race more competitive late in the season, and indirectly, to increase television ratings during the NFL season, which starts around the same time as the Chase begins. The Chase also forces teams to perform at their best during all three stages of the season, the first half of the regular season, the second half of the regular season, and the Chase.

Previously, the champion could have been determined before the last race, or even several races before the end of the season, because it was mathematically impossible for any other driver to gain enough points to overtake the leader.

=== Monster Energy ===
The Monster Energy NASCAR Cup Series logo from 2017 to 2019

The title sponsorship with Sprint ended after the 2016 season. On December 1, 2016, NASCAR announced it had reached an agreement with Monster Energy to become the new sponsor of NASCAR's premier series. On December 19, 2016, NASCAR announced the new name for the series, Monster Energy NASCAR Cup Series as well as the new series logo and new NASCAR logo. On April 11, 2018, Monster Energy announced an extension of their sponsorship of the series through the end of the 2019 season.

In 2017, stage racing was introduced. Races were broken up into three stages, four in the case of the NASCAR Cup Series' longest race, the Coca-Cola 600. A stage consists of normal green flag racing followed by a stoppage on a designated lap signified by the waving of a green and white checkered flag, then a yellow flag. The top-10 finishers in each of the first two stages are awarded bonus championship points, 10 points to the winner, 9 points for the 2nd place car, down to 1 point for the 10th place car. The points earned are added to a driver/owner's regular season points total, while the winner of the stage receives an additional point that is added to their point total, after the reset, if they get into the NASCAR playoffs. Stage lengths vary by track, but the first two stages usually combine to equal about half of the race. The final stage (which still pays out championship points to all drivers) usually equals the other half. The regular season points championship is awarded to the driver who scored the most points in the first 26 races (regular season). This championship does not award any bonus points to the winning driver. Otherwise, the points system and playoff format remained the same.

The MENCS trophy was in the form of a chalice that stood at three feet tall and weighed 68 lbs. Made of machined aluminum and taking over 300 hours of craftsmanship, the trophy's exterior was decorated with the outlines of all 23 NASCAR Cup Series tracks. The cup portion was said to hold approximately 600 ounces of liquids, or 37 cans of Monster Energy.

=== NASCAR Cup Series ===
Beginning with the 2020 season NASCAR's top level of competition became known as the NASCAR Cup Series. As part of a tiered sponsorship model, Busch Beer, Coca-Cola, GEICO, and Xfinity became the Premier Partners of the series, with Coca-Cola also assuming naming rights of the regular season trophy. In 2024, GEICO left as a premier partner, leaving NASCAR with 3 premier partners in 2025. Freeway Insurance joined as a premier partner in 2026.

The MENCS trophy design was retained under the new series name, though it was renamed the Bill France Cup.

== Drivers' Championship ==
The NASCAR Cup Series Drivers' Championship is awarded by the Chairman of NASCAR to the most successful Cup Series driver over a season, as determined by a points system based on race results and victories. First awarded in 1949 to Red Byron, 32 different drivers have won the Championship. The first driver to win multiple Championships was Herb Thomas in 1951 and 1953, while the record for the most Championships, seven, is shared by Richard Petty, Dale Earnhardt and Jimmie Johnson. Johnson has the record for most consecutive Championships; he won five Championships from 2006 to 2010. So far every Champion has originated from the United States.

== Owners' Championship ==
The Cup Series Owner's Championship operates in the same manner as the Driver's Championship, except that points are awarded to each individual car. If an owner enters more than one car, each car is viewed and scored as a separate entity. The points in the Owners Championship is identical to the Drivers' list, with one minor exception: Drivers who are not eligible to earn points toward the Drivers' title can still earn points toward the Owners' Championship. An example of this occurred in the first race under the current points system, the 2011 Daytona 500. Under another rule newly implemented for the 2011 season, drivers are only allowed to earn drivers' points in one of NASCAR's three national series. Trevor Bayne, who won the race, did not earn any drivers' points because he chose to run for the Nationwide Series championship. However, he earned 47 owner's points for Wood Brothers Racing (43 base points, three bonus points for the win, and one bonus point for leading a lap).

Before a major change to the points system was implemented in 2011, there was a slightly different addition to the system of allocating owner's points. If more than 43 cars attempted to qualify for a race, owner's points were awarded to each car in the following manner: the fastest non-qualifier (in essence, 44th position) received 31 points, three points fewer than the car in the 43rd position. If more than one car did not qualify, owners' points continued to be assigned in the manner described, decreasing by three for each position. Under the post-2010 point system, only cars that actually start in a given race earn owner's points.

There is a separate "Chase for the Championship" for the owners' points.

A 2005 rule change in NASCAR's three national series, revoked from 2013 onward, affects how the owner's points are used. Through the 2012 season, the top 35 (NASCAR Cup Series) or top 30 (other series) full-time teams in owner points are awarded exemptions for the next race, guaranteeing them a position in that race. These points determine who is in and who is out of the next race and have become crucial since the exemption rule was changed to its current format. At the end of each season, the top 35 contenders in owner's points are also locked into the first five races of the next season.

Beginning in 2013, the rules reverted to a system more similar to the pre-2005 rules. In the NASCAR Cup Series, the first 36 places in the field are determined strictly by qualifying speed. The next six places are awarded on owner points, with the final place reserved for a past Series Champion. If the final exemption is not used because all past Champions are already in the field, it will pass to another car based on the number of owner points.

In some circumstances, a team's owners' points will differ from the corresponding driver's points. In 2005, after owner Jack Roush fired Kurt Busch during the next-to-last race weekend of the season, the No. 97 team finished in eighth place in owner's points, while Busch ended up tenth in driver's points. In 2023, after Chase Elliott was injured, his No. 9 car continued to earn owner points during his absence, which ultimately culminated in a playoff berth in owners points, though Elliott himself did not make the playoffs as a driver. The team finished 10th and Elliott finished 17th.

== Manufacturers' Championship ==
A Manufacturer's Championship is awarded each year, although the Driver's Championship is considered more prestigious. In the past, manufacturer's championships were prestigious because of the number of manufacturers involved, and the manufacturer's championship was a major marketing tool. In the Xfinity Series, the championship is known as the Bill France Performance Cup.

Up to the 2013 season, points were scored in a 1960–1990 Formula One system, with the winner's manufacturer scoring nine points, six for the next manufacturer, four for the manufacturer third among makes, three for the fourth, two for the fifth, and one point for the sixth positioned manufacturer. This meant that if Chevrolets placed first through tenth in a given race and a Ford was 11th and a Dodge 12th, Chevrolet earned 9 points, Ford 6 and Dodge 4. Starting in 2014, NASCAR changed the system to mimic the Owner's Championship. Under this system, each manufacturer's best finishing representative effectively earned them the same number of points as that team earned, including any bonus points from leading a lap or winning the event.

=== Representation ===
In NASCAR's earliest years, there was a diverse array of machinery, with little support from the car companies themselves, but by the mid-1960s, participation was exclusively American manufacturers with factory support. Chrysler, Ford and General Motors were the primary, if not only, competitors for much of NASCAR's history. Plymouth, while somewhat successful in the 1960s with the Hemi, never won a Manufacturers Championship until Ford pulled out of racing in the early 1970s. GM was still using four different brands in NASCAR in 1991, but within three years, Buick and Oldsmobile were gone. Pontiac survived until 2004, leaving only Chevrolet. 2007 saw the first new brand since 1971, when Japanese manufacturer Toyota joined. Chrysler's Dodge brand returned after a 15-year hiatus in 2001, but departed after 2012, leaving just Chevrolet, Ford and Toyota.

Chevrolet has been the most successful manufacturer as of 2023, with 851 race wins and 42 manufacturers championships. Ford ranks second with 728 victories and 17 manufacturers championships. Dodge is third in wins with 217 and two manufacturers championships (albeit no longer in NASCAR), Plymouth fourth with 191 with one manufacturer championship (albeit no longer in NASCAR), Toyota fifth with 180 wins and three manufacturers championships, and Pontiac sixth with 154 and one manufacturer championship (albeit no longer in NASCAR).

== Cup cars ==
Cup Series cars (often called "Cup cars") adhere to a front engine rear-wheel-drive design. A roll cage serves as a space frame chassis and is covered by a composite carbon fiber body. They have a closed cockpit, fenders, a rear spoiler, and an aerodynamic splitter. Fielding a car for one season usually costs $10–20 million. Each team may build its own cars and engines (per NASCAR's specifications) or purchase cars and engines from other teams.

The cars are powered by EFI V8 engines since 2012 after 62 years using carburetion as engine fuel feed with compacted graphite iron blocks and pushrod valvetrains actuating two-valves per cylinder, and are limited to 358 cubic inches' (about 5.8 liters) displacement. However, modern technology has allowed power outputs near or over 900 horsepower (670 kW) in unrestricted form; while retaining the same basic engine design. In fact, before NASCAR instituted the gear rule, Cup engines were capable of operating more than 10,000 rpm. A NASCAR Cup Series engine with the maximum bore of 4.185 inches (106 millimeters) and stroke of 3.25 inches (83 millimeters) at 9,000 rpm has a mean piston speed of 80.44 fps (24.75 m/s). Contemporary Cup engines run 9,800 rpm, 87.59 fps (26.95 m/s), at the road course events, on Pocono Raceway's long front stretch, and at Martinsville Speedway (a .526-mile short-track). At the backbone 1.5- to 2.0-mile tri-oval tracks of NASCAR, the engines produce well over 850 hp running 9,200–9,400 rpm for 500 miles, 600 mi for the Coca-Cola 600 Charlotte race. The current NASCAR Cup engines curb weight is roughly at 575 lb (261 kg).

The front suspension is a double wishbone design, while the rear suspension was previously a two-link live axle design utilizing trailing arms until the 2022 debut of the NASCAR Next Gen Car at the Busch Lite Clash at the Coliseum, which featured the debut of the cars in their first competition and feature fully independent front and rear suspensions with double wishbones and adjustable inboard shocks. Brake rotors must be made of magnetic cast iron or steel and may not exceed 12.72 inches (32.3 centimeters) in diameter. The only aerodynamic components on the vehicles are the front splitter, spoiler, NACA ducts in the windows only, and side skirts. While the use of rear diffusers, vortex generators, canards, wheel well vents, hood vents, and undertrays was strictly prohibited into the Gen 6 era, the now-current Next Gen car features a rear diffuser similar to the diffusers used in NASCAR sister organization IMSA's GT Daytona class. While the cars may reach speeds of about 200 mph (320 km/h) on certain tracks, Russ Wicks drove a modified Dodge Charger stock car, built to NASCAR's specifications, 244.9 mph (394.1 km/h) during a speed record attempt at the Bonneville Salt Flats in October 2007.

NASCAR Cup Series engines carry a Freescale-provided electronic control unit, but traction control and anti-lock brakes are prohibited. Live telemetry is used only for television broadcasts, but the data can be recorded from the ECU to the computer if the car is in the garage and not on the track.

Cup cars are required to have at least one working windshield wiper installed on the car for the road courses (Sonoma, Watkins Glen, Circuit of the Americas, and the road course layout at the Charlotte Motor Speedway and Indianapolis Motor Speedway, as well at Daytona in 2021) as part of the road racing rules package.

=== Evolution of Cup cars ===
==== Generation 1 (1948–1964) ====
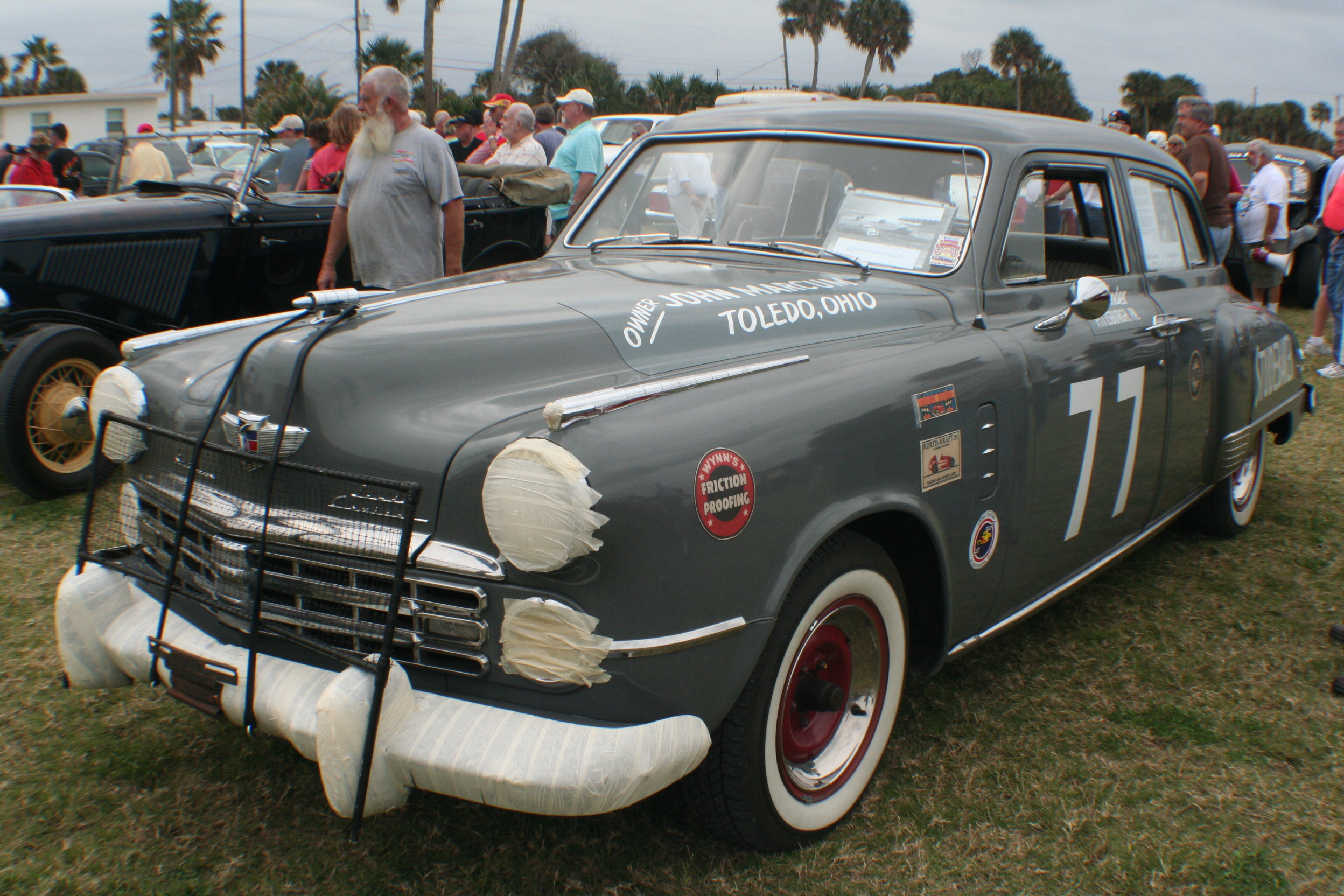
A Studebaker driven by Dick Linder in the 1951 Daytona Beach Road Course race.

When the series was formed under the name strictly stock, the cars were just that: production vehicles with no modifications allowed. The term stock car implied that the vehicles racing were unmodified street cars. Drivers would race with factory installed bench seats and AM radios still in the cars. To prevent broken glass from getting on the race track, windows would be rolled down, external lights would be removed or taped over, and side-view mirrors would be removed. The 1957 fuel injected 150 model Chevrolet (known as "the black widow") was the first car to be outlawed by NASCAR. The 1957 Chevrolet won the most races, with 59 wins, more than any car to ever race in the cup series. Before the mid-1960s, cars were typically based on full sized cars such as the Chevrolet Bel Air and Ford Galaxie.

==== Generation 2 (1965–1980) ====
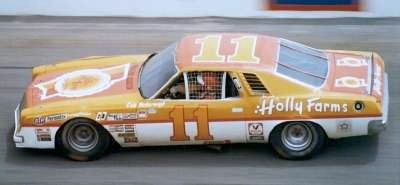
Cale Yarborough's Chevrolet Chevelle Laguna

In 1965, modified chassis came to the sport. Mid-size cars including the Ford Fairlane and Plymouth Belvedere were adopted and soon became the norm. NASCAR once enforced a homologation rule that at various times stated that at least 500 cars had to be produced, or as many as one car for every make's dealership in the nation had to be sold to the general public to allow it to be raced. Eventually, cars were made expressly for NASCAR competition, including the Ford Torino Talladega, which had a rounded nose, and the Dodge Charger Daytona and Plymouth Superbird which had a rear wing raised above roof level and a shark shaped nose-cap which enabled race speeds of exactly 200 mph. The Ford-based Mercury Spoiler powered by a Ford Boss 429 engine was timed at 199.6 mph. Beginning in 1971, NASCAR rewrote the rules to effectively force the Ford and Chrysler specialty cars (nicknamed the Aero Warriors) out of competition by limiting them to 305ci (5.0L). The cars affected by this rule include the Ford Talladega, Mercury Spoiler II, Dodge Charger 500, Dodge Charger Daytona and the Plymouth Superbird. This rule was so effective in limiting performance that only one car that season ever attempted to run in this configuration.

Beginning in August 1970, NASCAR handicapped engines over 366 cubic inches (6.0 liters) with a restrictor plate. NASCAR phased in a rule to lower the maximum engine displacement from 430 cubic inches (7.0 liters) to 366 cubic inches (6.0 liters). In 1974, maximum engine displacement was increased from 430 cubic inches to 433 cubic inches. In 1975, NASCAR reduced the maximum small block engine displacement from 366 cubic inches (6.0 liters) to its present 358 cubic inches (5.9 liters). The transition was not complete until 1977 and coincided with American manufacturers ending factory support of racing and the 1973 oil crisis.

==== Generation 3 (1981–1991) ====
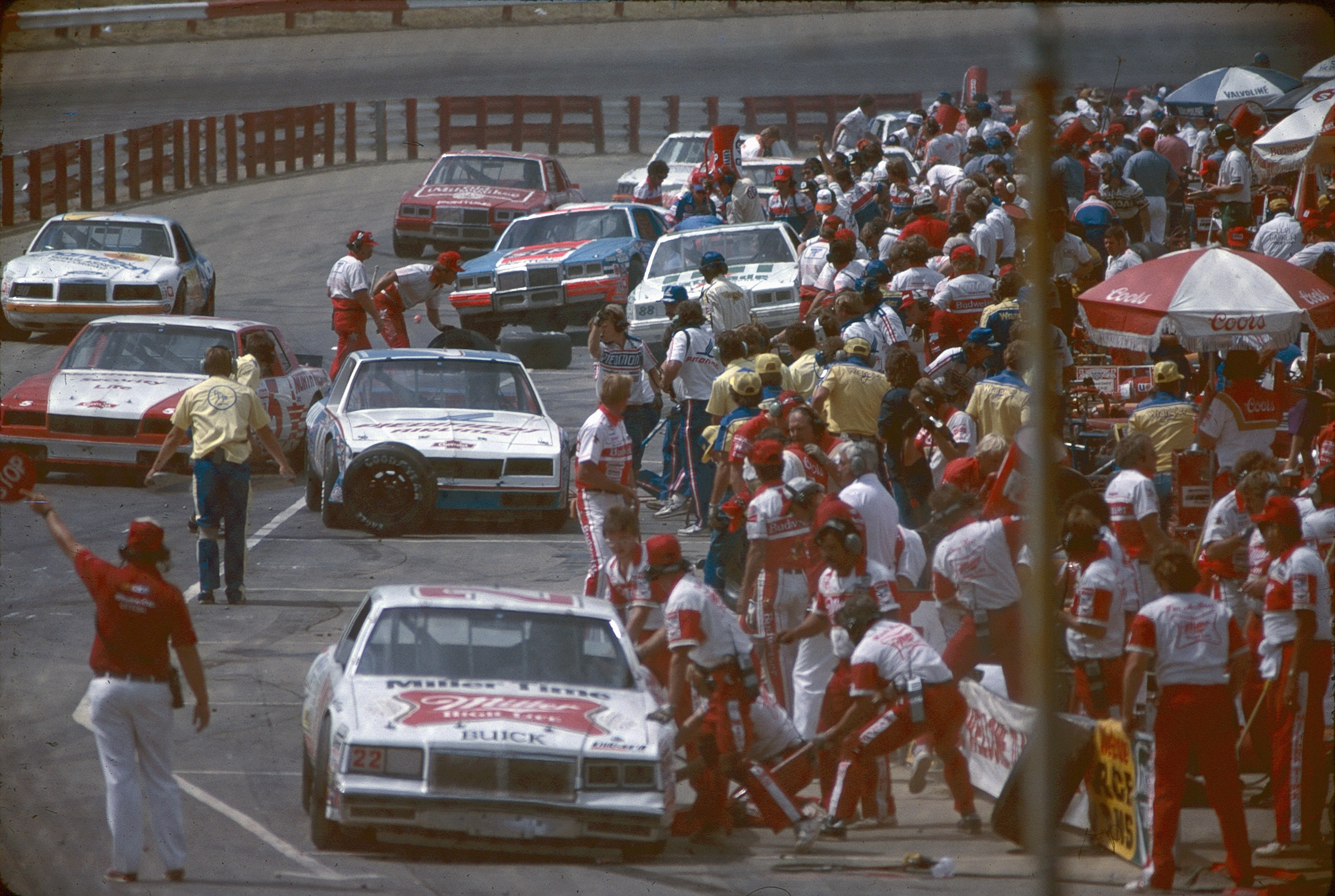
The pit road at Richmond International Raceway in 1984

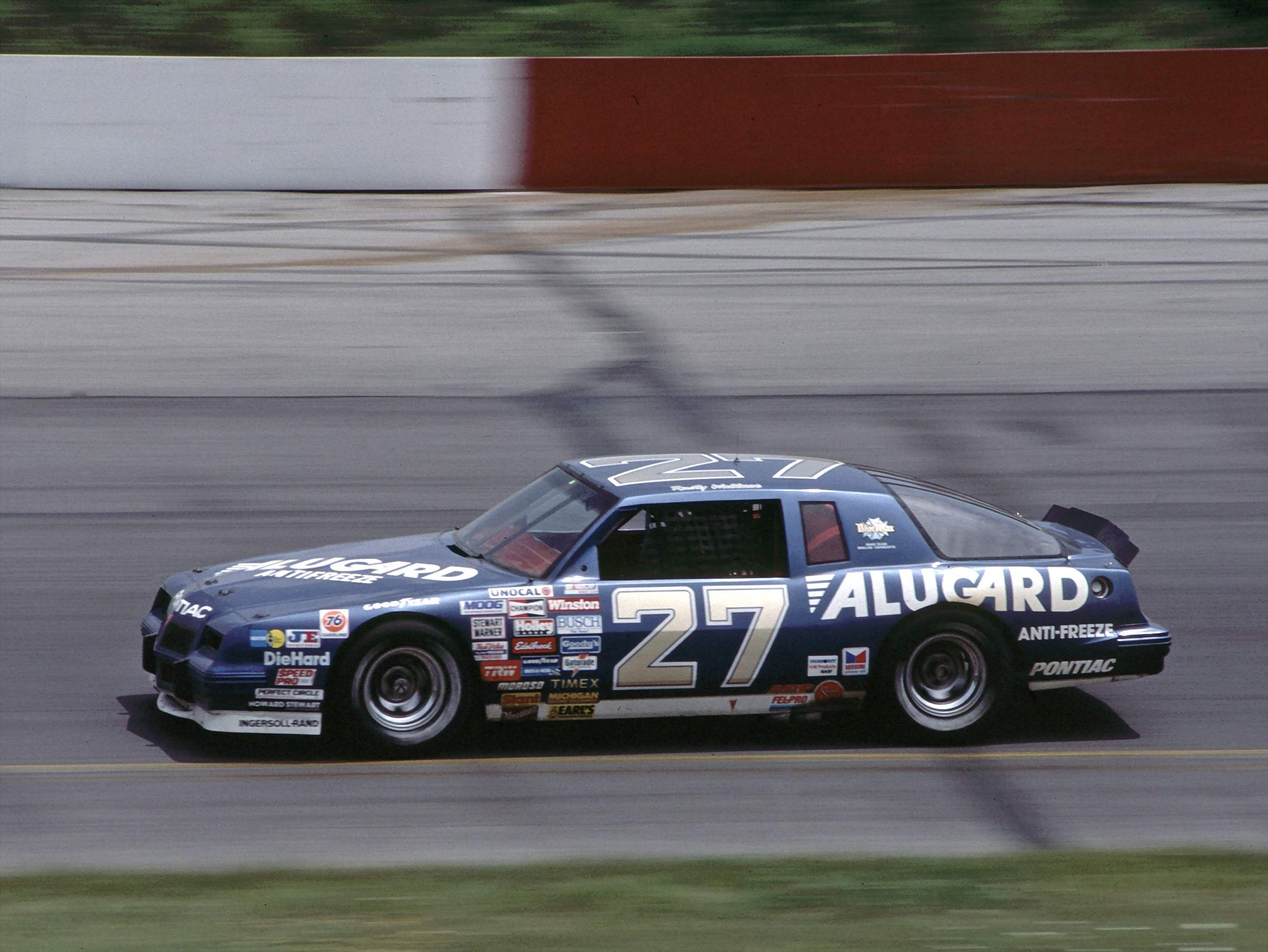
Rusty Wallace's #27 Pontiac Grand Prix at Pocono in 1986

The downsizing of American cars in the late 1970s presented a challenge for NASCAR. Rules mandated a minimum wheelbase of 115 inches (2,900 mm), but after 1979, none of the models approved for competition met the standard, as mid-sized cars now typically had wheelbases between 105 and 112 inches. After retaining the older models (1977 for the GM makes, and 1979 for Ford and Dodge) through 1980, for the 1981 season the wheelbase requirement was reduced to 110 inches (2,800 mm), which the newer model cars could be stretched to meet without affecting their appearance. The Buick Regal with its swept-back "shovel" nose initially dominated competition, followed by the rounded, aerodynamic 1983 Ford Thunderbird. The Chevrolet Monte Carlo and Pontiac Grand Prix adopted bubble back windows to stay competitive. Amid its financial woes, and after dropping its poor performing (both on the race track and for consumer sales) Dodge Mirada and Chrysler Cordoba in 1983, Chrysler Corporation left NASCAR entirely at the end of the 1985 season.

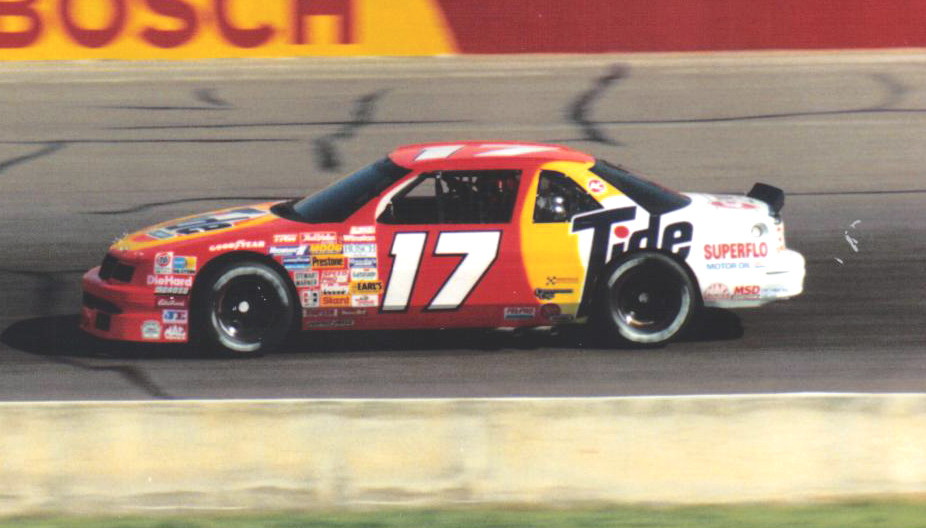
Darrell Waltrip's 1989 Chevrolet Lumina at Phoenix Raceway

1987 marked a milestone for NASCAR Cup Series cars. During Winston 500 qualifying, Bill Elliott established a world stock-car record when he posted a speed of 212.809 mph (342 km/h). Then the unfortunate happened; during the 22nd lap of the race, driver Bobby Allison suffered a flat tire in the middle of Talladega Superspeedway's tri-oval. Allison's car hit the catch fence and tore a hole in the fence approximately 100 feet (30 m) long. Several spectators were injured in the accident, including one woman who lost an eye. In the aftermath of the crash, NASCAR mandated the use of a restrictor plate at Talladega Superspeedway and Daytona International Speedway to reduce speeds. By 1989, GM had switched its mid-sized models to V6 engines and front-wheel-drive, but the NASCAR racers only kept the body shape, with the old V8 rear-wheel-drive running gear, rendering obsolete the "stock" nature of the cars.

==== Generation 4 (1992–2007) ====
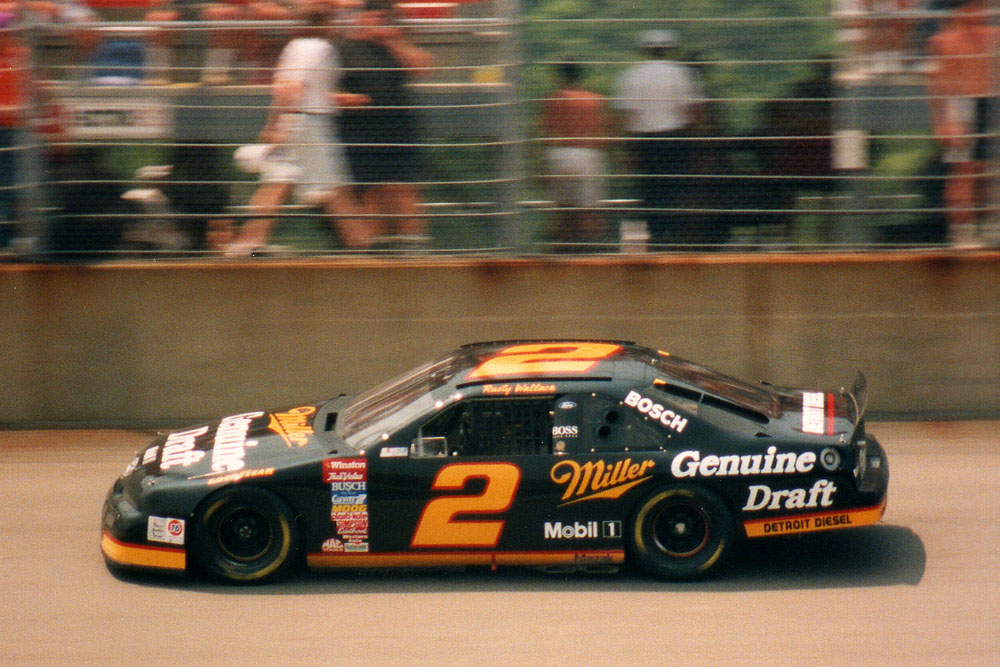
Rusty Wallace's 1994 Ford Thunderbird at Michigan International Speedway. Early Generation 4 cars retained boxier appearance from the previous generation.

1992 marked the beginning of the generation that stripped all semblance of "stock" from "stock car racing", the Generation 4 car. Stock body panels were removed from the sport, and steel bumpers were replaced by fiberglass to reduce weight. In 1994, roof flaps were added to all cars after Rusty Wallace's two infamous airborne crashes in 1993. In 1995, the newly designed Chevrolet Monte Carlo returned to the sport, which started the trend of rounder body shapes. When the Ford Thunderbird was retired after 1997, without Ford having any two-door intermediate bodies, the four-door Ford Taurus body was used (although NASCAR racers actually have no opening doors).

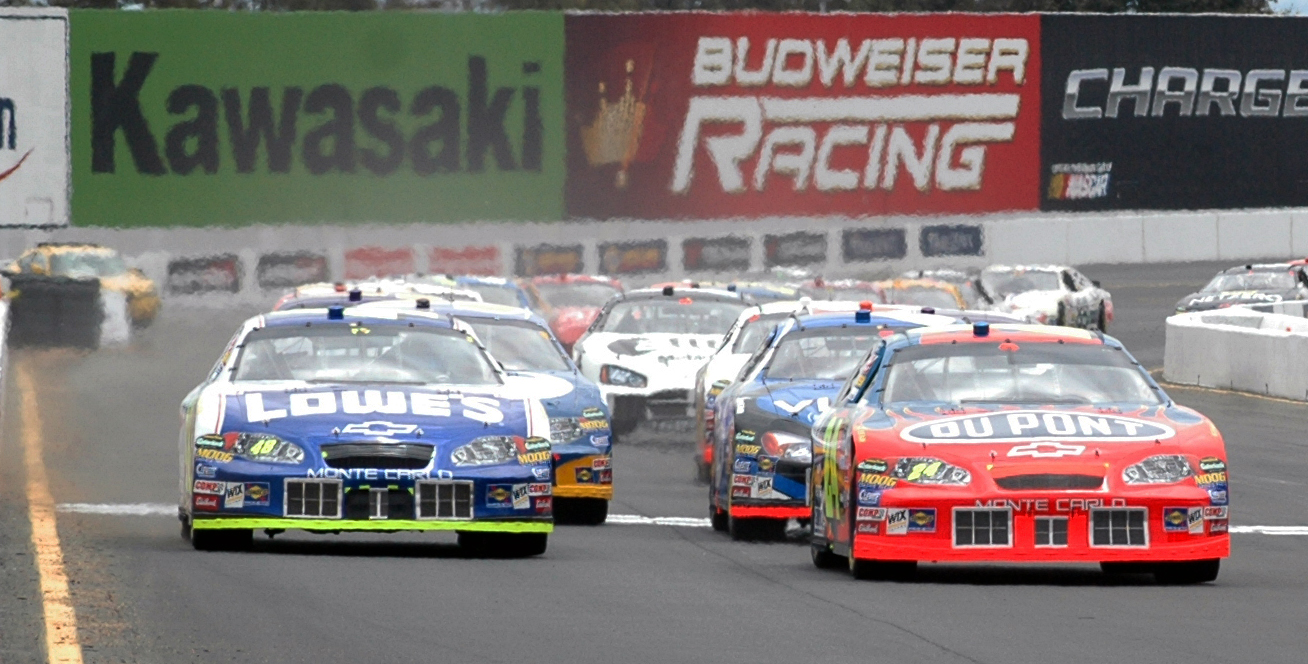
The green flag at Infineon Raceway (now Sonoma Raceway) in 2005

While the manufacturers and models of automobiles used in racing were named for production cars (Dodge Charger R/T, Chevrolet Impala SS, Toyota Camry, and the Ford Fusion), the similarities between NASCAR Cup Series cars and actual production cars were limited to a small amount of shaping and painting of the nose, headlight and tail light decals, and grill areas. Until 1998, the hood, roof, and decklid were still required to be identical to their stock counterparts. This was eliminated when NASCAR allowed significant modifications of the Ford Taurus decklid so the car would fit the required templates.

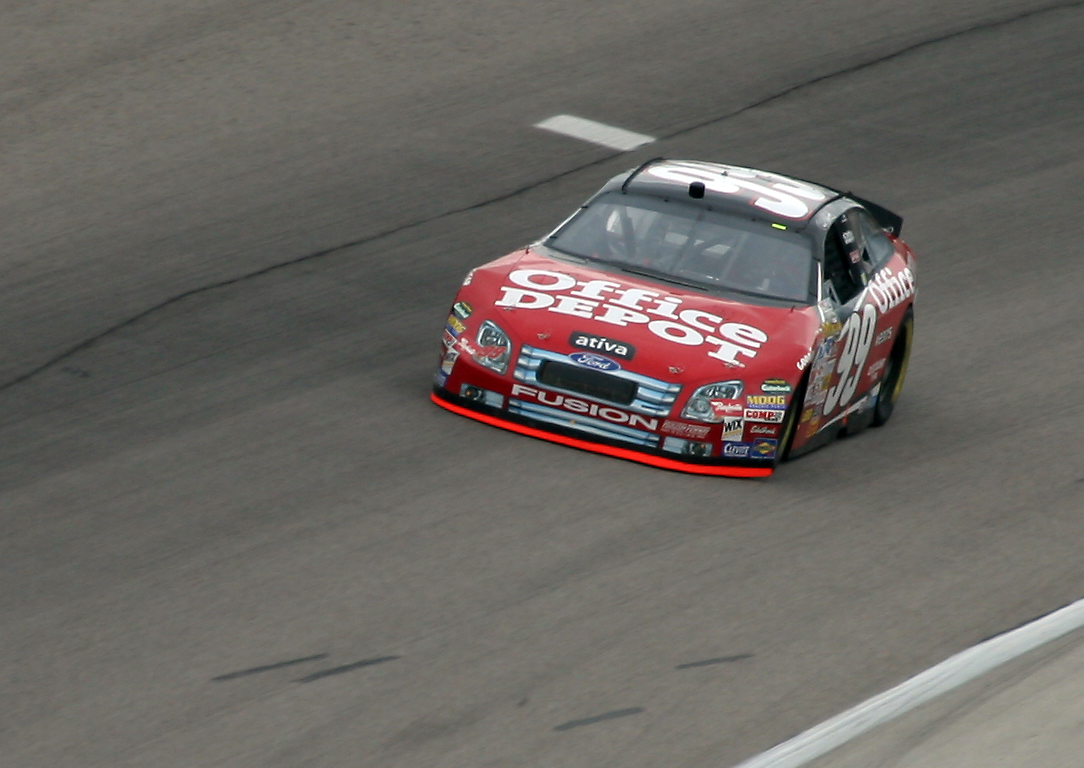
Carl Edwards' 2007 Ford Fusion at Texas Motor Speedway. By the final year of Generation 4, offset cars (also known as "Twisted Sisters") had become commonplace.

It was in this time that NASCAR engaged in the practice of mandating rule changes during the season if one particular car model became overly dominant. This often led to claims that some teams would attempt sandbagging to receive more favorable handicaps.

Because of the notorious manner of the Ford Taurus race car and how the manufacturer turned the car into an "offset" car (the car was notoriously asymmetrical in race trim because of its oval shape), NASCAR ended this practice to put more emphasis on parity and based new body rules in 2003, similar to short track racing, where offset cars had become a burden for race officials, resulting in the "Approved Body Configuration" (also known as "common template") design.

==== Car of Tomorrow (2007–2012) ====
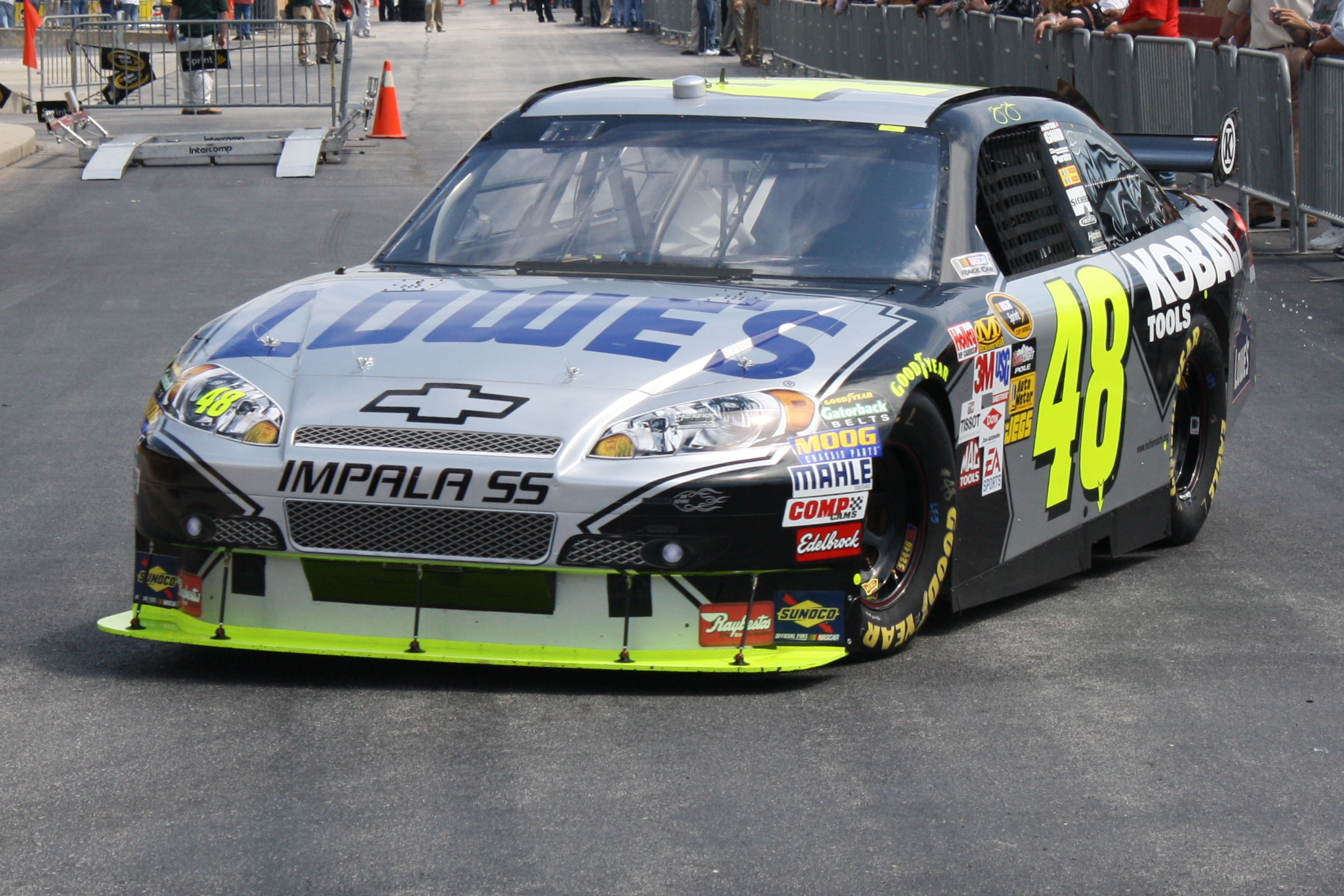
Jimmie Johnson's 2009 COT in the garage at Las Vegas Motor Speedway, featuring the wing used until the 2010 Goody's Fast Pain Relief 500.

In 2007, NASCAR introduced a radically new vehicle specification known as the "Car of Tomorrow" (CoT). The CoT made its debut at Bristol Motor Speedway in March 2007. Initially, it was only used at 16 selected events. While NASCAR had originally planned to wait until the start of the 2009 season to use the CoT in every race, the date was changed to the start of the 2008 season. Many drivers still had complaints about the CoT, but this new timeline was intended to help teams save money by giving them only one car specification to work on.

The design of the CoT has focused on cost control, parity, and driver safety. The car's width was increased by 4 inches (10 centimeters), the bumpers were re-designed to render bump and run tactics less effective, and the height of the car has increased by 2 inches (5 centimeters) to accommodate taller drivers and increase aerodynamic drag. The driver's seat was moved closer to the center of the car. The change most notable to fans was the addition of a rear wing replacing the familiar spoiler. The wings could be adjusted between 0 and 16 degrees and used with multiple configurations of end plates.

The new rules eliminated the asymmetrical bodies on cars, which had run rampant since the 1998 Taurus launch (and intensified by the final years of the Generation 4 car). However, almost all advantages of using one car over another have been nullified. NASCAR requires all CoTs to conform to common body templates, regardless of make and model.

The rear wing remained a controversial feature for a few years. Its appearance was often criticized, and it was accused of forcing cars to become airborne in high-speed spins such as the one experienced by Carl Edwards during the 2009 Aaron's 499 at Talladega Superspeedway. In 2010 NASCAR decided to replace the wing with the original spoiler. The switch began with the 2010 Goody's Fast Pain Relief 500 at Martinsville Speedway.

In 2011, NASCAR altered the nose of the car once more, with the splitter being reduced in size and the braces being replaced by a solid front valence.

A major engine change occurred in 2012 with NASCAR's introduction of fuel injection technology. Initially NASCAR indicated that it would transition to fuel injection midway through the 2011 season but decided before that season to put off the change until 2012.

==== Generation 6 (2013–2021) ====
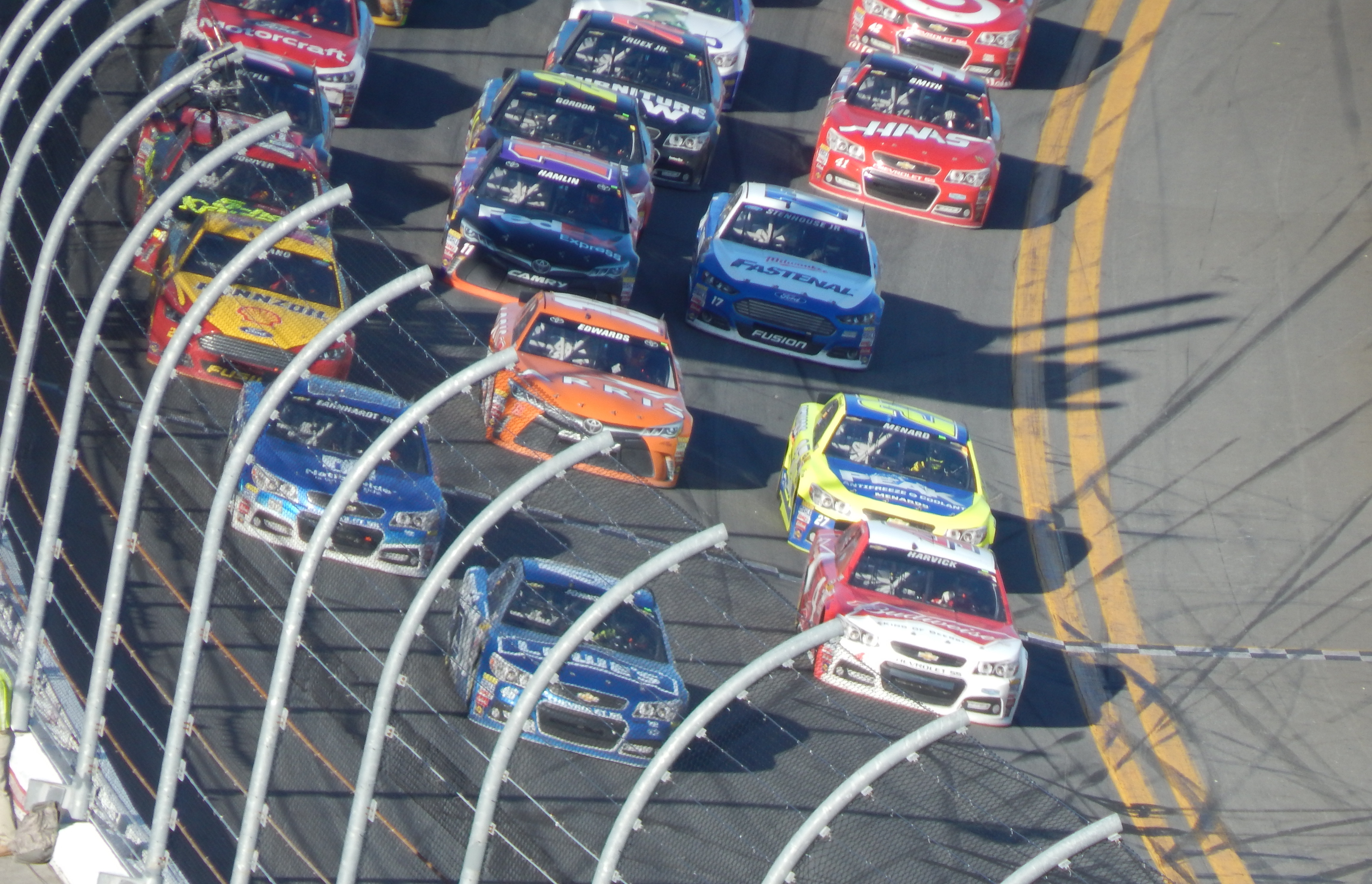
Jimmie Johnson leads a pack of Generation 6 cars three-wide multiple rows back in the 2015 Daytona 500.

In 2013, manufacturers were given increased leeway for branding their NASCAR Cup Series cars, creating the Generation 6 race car. These changes were made so the cars would resemble their street counterparts more closely, as was done in the Xfinity Series in 2011.

All NASCAR Cup Series cars began utilizing a digital dash sold by McLaren in 2016. This dash includes sixteen customizable preset screens, allowing the driver to monitor all the previous info with several additional elements such as lap time and engine diagnostics, for a total of twenty-four data elements. Information can be displayed as a gauge, numeral, bar graph or LED.

Having mostly competed with cars based on sedan models during the generation's life, the sales decline of sedans in American car market resulted in return of pony cars (and thus, coupe-based models) to the Cup Series as Chevrolet switched to the Chevrolet Camaro in 2018, followed by Ford switching to the Ford Mustang the following year.

==== Next Gen (2022–present) ====
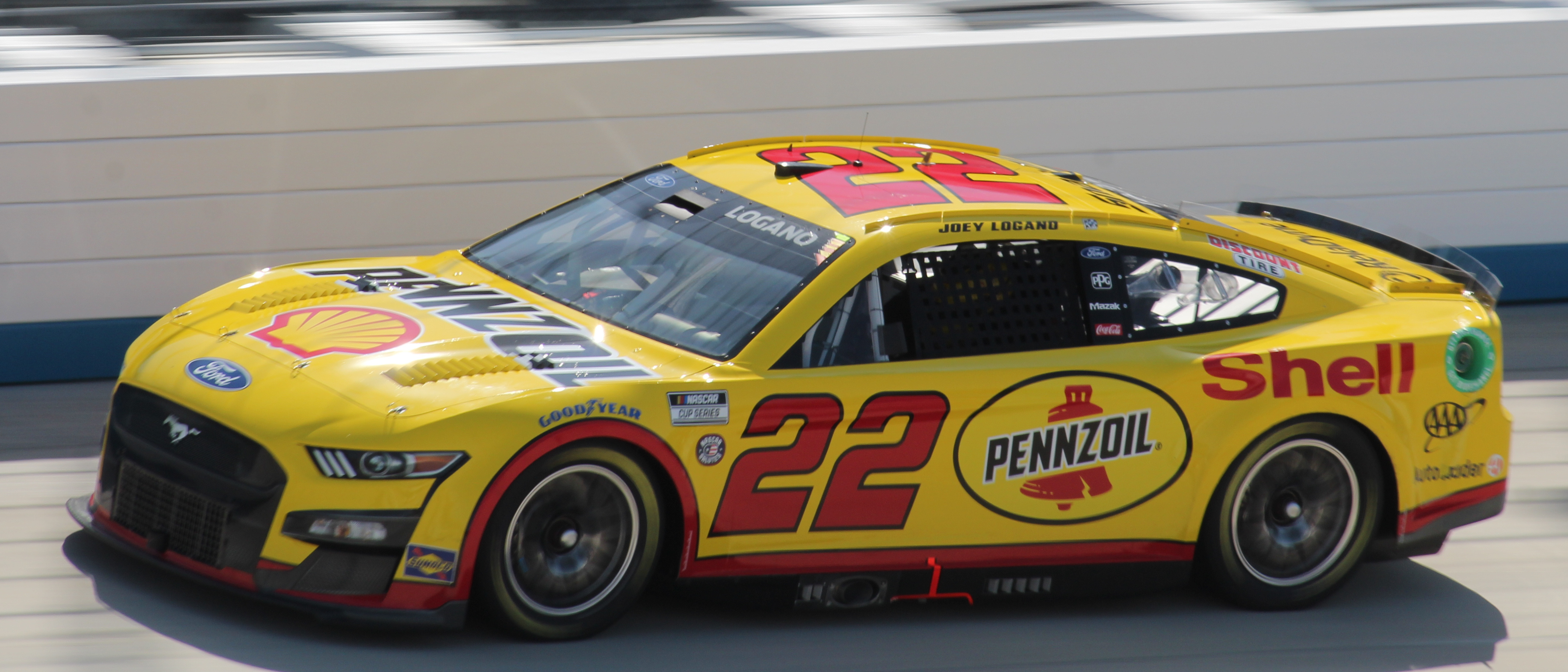
Next Gen car driven by Joey Logano.

In 2022, NASCAR introduced an all new, seventh-generation car named the Next Gen. A further evolution of the Generation 6 car, the Next Gen features improved aero and downforce packages while introducing new technologies (such as center lock wheels and rear diffusers, technologies used in road racing cars) on the track. In addition, the Next Gen car is meant to lower costs and attract new original equipment manufacturers (OEMs) to compete with Chevrolet, Ford, and Toyota.

In 2023, a heavily modified Next Gen Camaro fielded by Hendrick Motorsports entered the 2023 24 Hours of Le Mans, where it finished 39th out of the 62 cars entered in the event.

=== Setup ===
The automobiles' suspension, brakes, and aerodynamic components are also selected to tailor the cars to different racetracks. A car that understeers is said to be "tight", or "pushing", causing the car to keep going up the track with the wheel turned all the way left, while one that oversteers is said to be "loose" or "free", causing the back end of the car to slide around, which can result in the car spinning out if the driver is not careful. The adjustment of front and rear aerodynamic downforce, spring rates, track bar geometry, brake proportioning, the wedge (also known as cross-weight), changing the camber angle, and changing the air pressure in the tires can all change the distribution of forces among the tires during cornering to correct for handling problems. Recently, coil bind setups have become popular among teams.

These characteristics are also affected by tire stagger (tires of different circumference at different positions on the car, the right rear having the most influence in left turns) and rubber compounds used in tire construction. These settings are determined by NASCAR and Goodyear engineers and may not be adjusted by individual teams.

Changing weather conditions may also affect a car's handling. In a long race, it is sometimes advantageous to prepare a car to handle well at the end of an event while surrendering the advantage of speed at the start. On oval races, rain forces a race to be halted immediately. NASCAR had developed rain tires for Cup Series road racing as early as late 1990s, but initially abandoned them because there at the time were not enough road courses on the schedule to justify the cost of making more tires to replace them as they aged. The first in-race use of rain tires in the Cup Series were at the 2020 Bank of America Roval 400 and the 2021 Texas Grand Prix. Prior to these, a 1956 race at Road America was held in rain; Tim Flock won the race.

== Cup tracks ==
NASCAR Cup tracks in 2027
Points paying races Non Points paying races

Presently, the NASCAR Cup Series is held mainly in eastern states, with only eight tracks located west of the Mississippi River. Cup Series races are not conducted on standardized tracks; the 2025 season included 30 races at oval tracks and 6 at road courses. The lap length of the oval tracks vary from .526 miles (0.847 km) at Martinsville Speedway to 2.66 miles (4.28 km) at Talladega Superspeedway. The majority of the oval tracks are paved with asphalt, while 3 tracks are wholly or partially paved with concrete. Although the series historically raced on dirt tracks, it ceased to do so for more than 50 years after the 1970 season. In 2021, dirt racing returned to the schedule with a March event at Bristol Motor Speedway.

A satellite view of Charlotte Motor Speedway, a typical NASCAR track with a quad-oval configuration. The infield roval also hosts a Cup Series event, with the inaugural event in 2018.

While some tracks are true ovals, such as Bristol Motor Speedway, over half the tracks currently in Cup competition are a form of tri-oval. Other configurations include Darlington Raceway's characteristic uneven "egg" shape, the triangular Pocono Raceway, and the rectangle of Indianapolis Motor Speedway.

While NASCAR is known for primarily running counter-clockwise on oval tracks, Sonoma Raceway, Watkins Glen International, and Coronado Street Course, are complex road courses which are raced clockwise. The series' first road course event was held in 1954, at Linden Airport in New Jersey. Since 1963, the series has raced on at least one road course every year.

Courses have a wide range of banking in the corners. New Hampshire Motor Speedway, with 7 degrees of banking, has the flattest corners, while the steepest banking is Talladega Superspeedway's 33 degrees. Tracks also vary in amount of banking on the straightaways, from entirely flat on many courses to 9 degrees at Dover International Speedway.

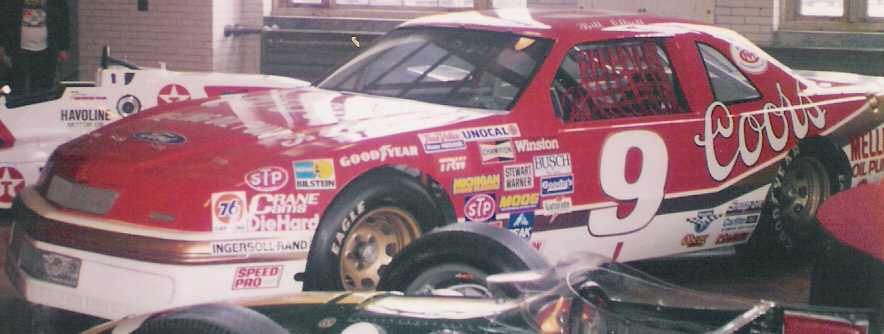
Bill Elliott's Melling Racing car that set the record for the fastest lap in a stock car – 212.809 mph (342.483 km/h), 44.998 seconds at Talladega Superspeedway.

Race speeds vary widely depending on the track. The fastest track is Talladega Superspeedway, where the record average speed is 188.354 mph (303.126 km/h) and the record qualifying lap is 212.809 mph (342.483 km/h), set by Bill Elliott in 1987. The record stands unlikely to be broken, as restrictor plates were made mandatory at superspeedways in 1988 to reduce speeds, and the plates were then replaced in 2019 by tapered spacers which still reduced enough horsepower to prevent cars from going beyond speed of 205 mph. The slowest tracks are Sonoma Raceway, a road course with a record average speed of only 83.6 mph (134.5 km/h) and a record qualifying lap of 99.3 mph (159.8 km/h), and Martinsville Speedway, a short, nearly flat "paper clip" oval, with a record average speed of 82.2 mph (132.3 km/h) and a record qualifying lap of 99.9 mph (160.8 km/h). The average speed of a race is determined by dividing the winner's race time (from the waving of the green flag to the waving of the checkered flag, including laps spent under caution) by the distance of the race. Time elapsed during red flag periods is not included in the calculation of the average speed.

== See also ==
- List of all-time NASCAR Cup Series winners
- List of NASCAR Cup Series champions
- List of NASCAR tracks
- List of NASCAR teams
- NASCAR O'Reilly Auto Parts Series
- NASCAR Truck Series
- NASCAR rules and regulations
- NASCAR Rookie of the Year
