= Sprint race =

The term Sprint race may refer to:

- Formula One sprint racing
- Short-distance speed skating races
- Short horse racing competitions
- Sprint car racing
- Sprint cycling events
- Sprint running events in track and field

== See also ==
- Sprint Cup (disambiguation)
