= Sprint Cup (trophy) =

Former NASCAR award

Sprint Cup Trophy
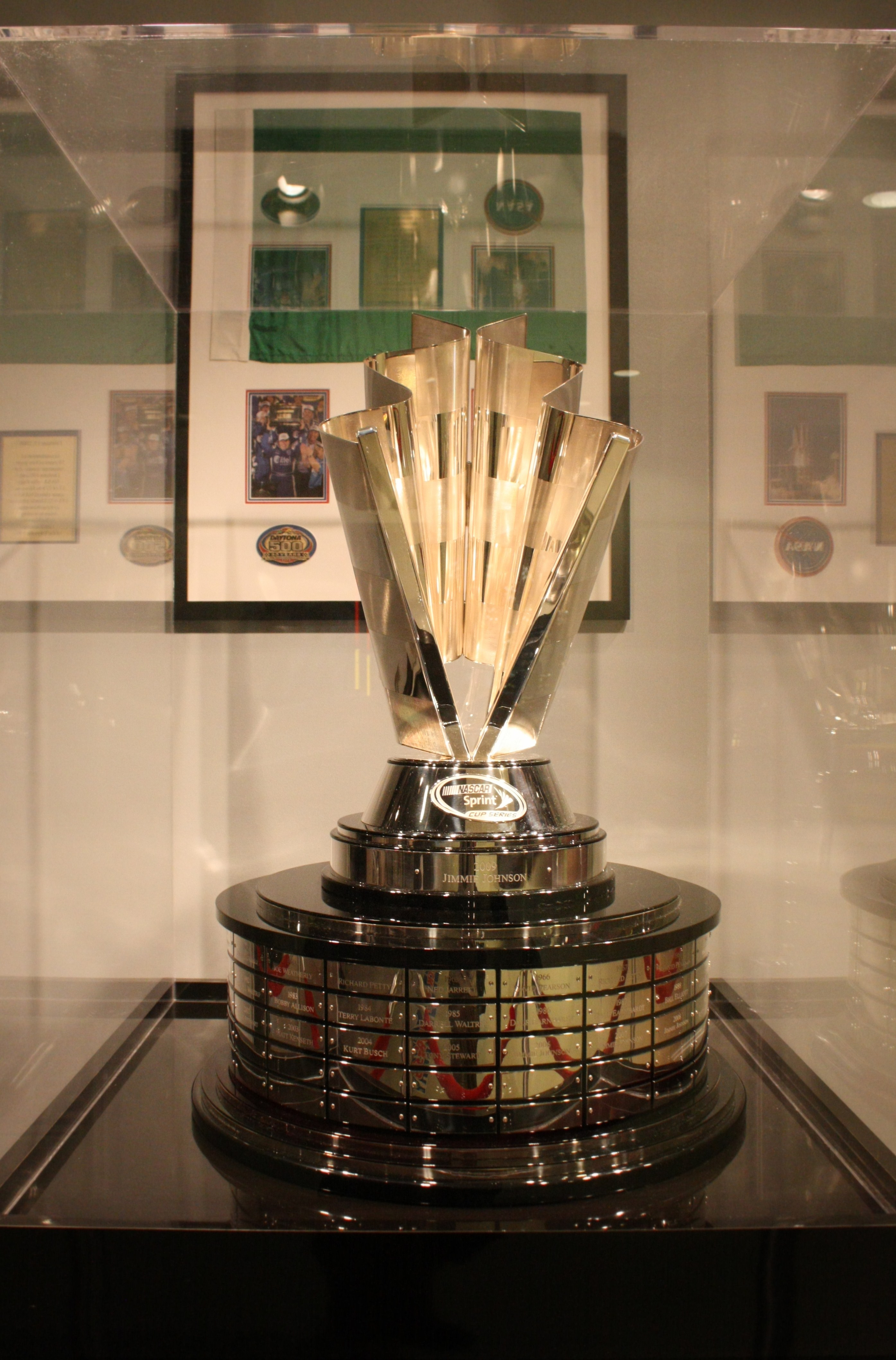
- The trophy
- Awarded for: Having the highest points total after the 10 race Chase
- Sponsored by: Sprint Corporation
- Location: Homestead-Miami Speedway
- Country: United States
- Presented by: NASCAR
- First award: 2004
- Final award: 2016

The Sprint Cup Trophy was the trophy that was presented to the championship winner of the premier series of the National Association for Stock Car Auto Racing (NASCAR) from 2004 to 2016.

It is made of sterling silver with a wood base and it depicts two checkered flags in flight, and was created by silversmiths Tiffany & Co., whose other major championship trophies in sports have included the World Series (Major League Baseball) Commissioner's Trophy, the NFL's Vince Lombardi Trophy, given to the champions of the Super Bowl, the Larry O'Brien Trophy, handed to the playoff champions of the NBA following the NBA Finals, and the Philip F. Anschutz Trophy, given to the champions of Major League Soccer.

The trophy is 24 inches (61 cm) tall and weighs 27 pounds (12 kg). It was designed in 2003 by Bruce Newman and was first awarded in 2004 to series champion Kurt Busch and the last one being awarded to Jimmie Johnson in 2016.

The Sprint Cup was awarded to the driver who scores the most points after the Chase for the Sprint Cup at a post season awards banquet in Las Vegas (formerly New York City) in December and is crowned the champion for that season. The winner maintains permanent possession of the trophy, but some teams display the trophy in their race shop. Also teams who had not won a Sprint Cup usually had a reserved display case located in their race shop for the trophy.

Traditionally, there were three Sprint Cup trophies handed out; one each to the championship driver, team, and primary sponsor.

There was a permanent Sprint Cup trophy at the Daytona 500 Experience next to Daytona International Speedway that featured all of the past champions into perpetuity. Another Sprint Cup was located within NASCAR's New York City offices that is put on display during "Championship Week", when the annual awards ceremony and banquet honoring that year's champion is held and another one travels from track-to-track as part of the Sprint Experience tour.

After Monster Energy became the Cup Series' title sponsor in 2017, a new trophy later called the Bill France Cup was introduced.
