= Coil bind =

NASCAR racing setup style

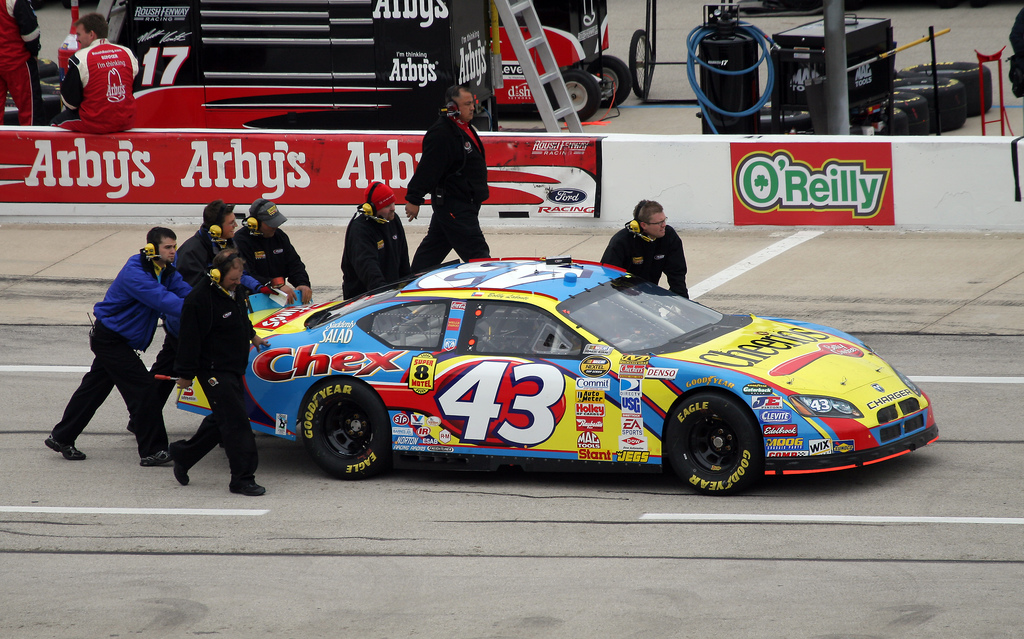
At rest the air dam (red) of a car appears several inches above the ground.

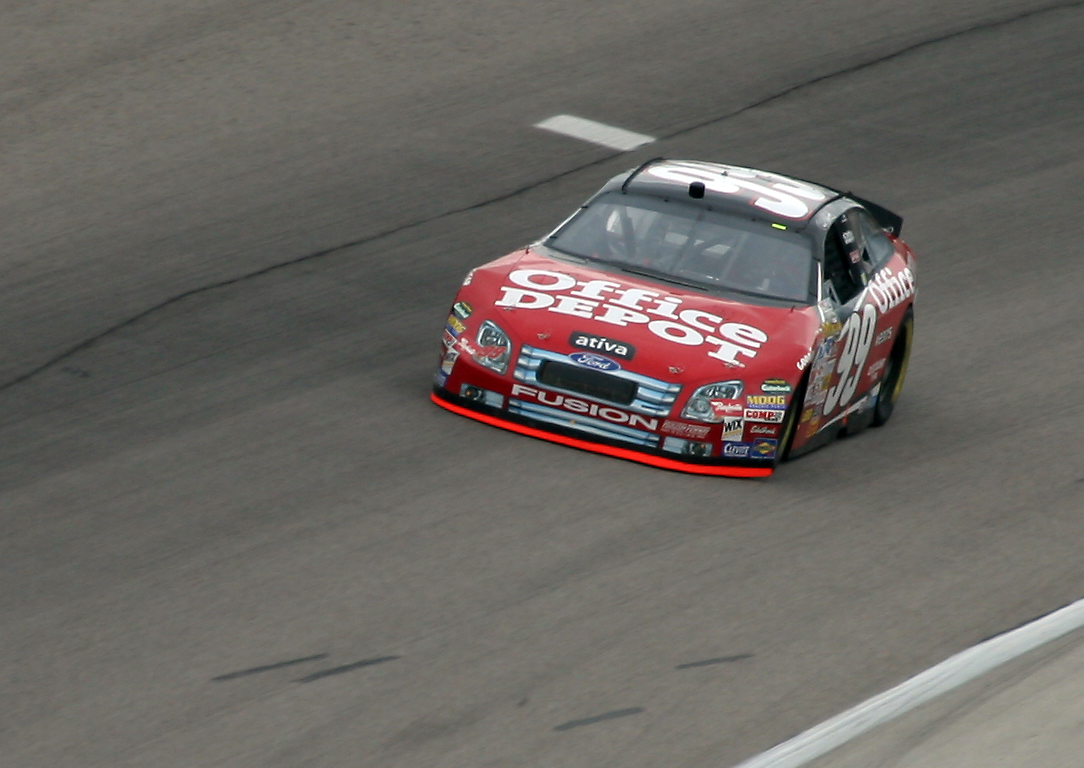
At full speed the air dam appears much closer to the ground.

Coil bind is a style of setup used in various levels of NASCAR racing. Coil bind setups utilize very soft front springs and very stiff rear springs to control the pitch attitude of the body. This is in contrast with conventional setups which place the stiffer springs at the front of the car for superior mechanical grip, that is grip via the vehicle suspension and tires. Coil bind uses aerodynamics to produce grip.

As a car approaches the end of a straightaway, the downforce generated by the body of the car should increase the sprung weight until the coil springs compress until they bind and the suspension can no longer travel (hence the name). The goal of coil bind is to keep the air dam (or splitter if applicable) at the front of the car as low to the ground as possible to create an area of low pressure under the car. The result is similar to ground effects. Under braking, weight transfer causes more weight to shift forward as the vehicle decelerates. This helps to maintain the low-pressure area below the car by keeping the front of the car low to the ground. While coil bind setups do yield faster lap times, the cars are more sensitive to turbulence generated by nearby cars.

== See also ==
- Car handling
- Racing setup
- Vehicle dynamics
