= Tire recycling in the United States =

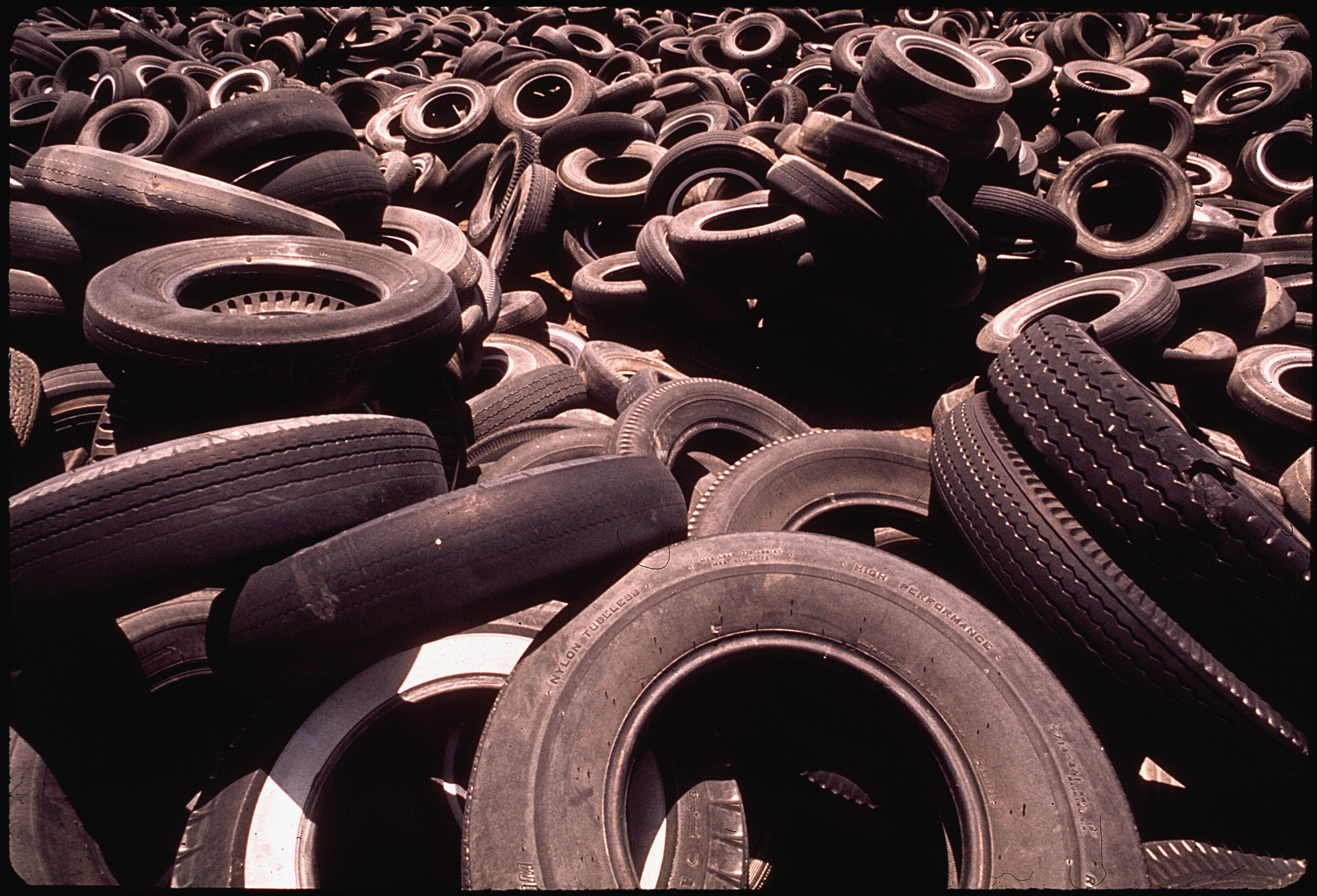
Waste tire dump in San Joaquin, California in 1972

Tire recycling in the United States is the disposal and reuse of waste tires.

== Uses ==
Several forms of waste disposal and reclamation have been put into place, using waste tires as both commodities (new tires) and a form of energy (fuel alternative).

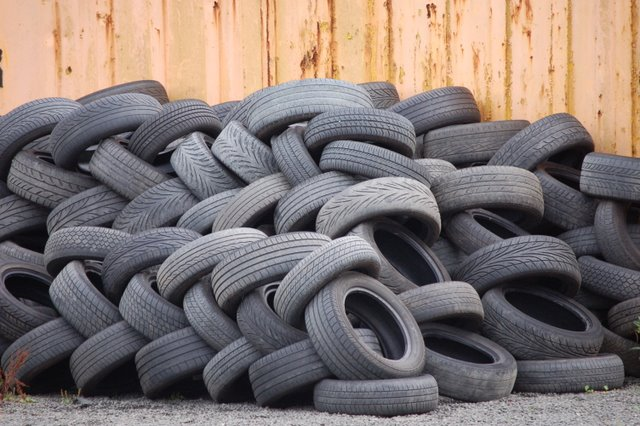
Used tires

According to the Rubber Manufacturers Association (RMA), as reported elsewhere,

- 52% of scrap tires are burned for fuel
- 12% are used in crumb rubber products
- 16% are used for civil engineering applications
- at least 14% are ground and dumped in landfills.

Different agencies in the world are now recycling waste tires and other rubber goods into useful products instead of polluting the environment.

Whole tires can be used for a number of applications, including artificial reefs, breakwaters, erosion control, playground equipment, and highway crash barriers.

Waste tires are made of a material which can have another economic use. This means that tires which are no longer suitable for use on vehicles due to wear or damage, can be recycled to serve a new economic purpose (rubber asphalt and concrete, fuel alternatives, carbon sources, etc.).

There are many different uses for waste tires that are beneficial in helping reduce the amount of waste tires in stockpiles. Recycled tires are used in creating synthetic turf in sports arenas. Synthetic turf is made up of crumb rubber which is recycled rubber from automotive or truck scrap tires. Waste tires are also used to make rubber mulch which is used in gardens and playgrounds. Waste tires have also been known to be used in making track and field pavements, roads, and shooting targets. Recycled waste tires have several recreational uses. They are used for tire swings, flower pots, compost bins, retaining walls, and sandals in developing companies. They can also be used as fuel energy. Waste tires used as fuel are either shredded or whole, depending on the combustion device being used. Fuel produced from waste tires is known as tire-derived fuel (TDF).

There is a potential for using waste tire rubber to make activated-carbon adsorbents for air-quality control applications. Such an approach provides a recycling path for waste tires and the production of new adsorbents from a low-cost waste material. Also, recycled rubber from tires is used as a component of various products commonly known as "tire derived products". Such products include asphalt paving mixtures and as extenders in a variety of rubber products such as roofing materials, walk pads, carpet and flooring underlay and other products. More such products are being developed.

== Processing ==
To convert the waste tire into a valuable product, it must first be reduced in size and then recycled. The recycling process begins first by shredding tires into small manageable chips, which are then cooled to cryogenic temperatures, causing them to become brittle. They are then pulverized into a material that must be screened to remove large chunks of rubber or polymer. Finally, the remaining fibre and magnetic material are separated from the pulverized material using a magnetic separator and a vibrational separator. This form of recycling is environmentally friendly, and allows a valuable resource to be used again and again.

== Disposal ==
In 2007, around 300 million tires were scrapped in the United States. In 2008 around one billion tires were being scrapped each year with an estimated further four billion already in stockpiles and landfills. Global production in 2008 was about 1.5 billion new tires. The U.S. alone produced 291.8 million tyres in 2009 as estimated by the U.S. Rubber Manufacturers Association. In 2013, 3,824 thousand tonnes (3,764,000 long tons; 4,215,000 short tons) of tires were generated in the U.S. Newer figures (2015) talk about 450 million scrap tires generated annually in the U.S.

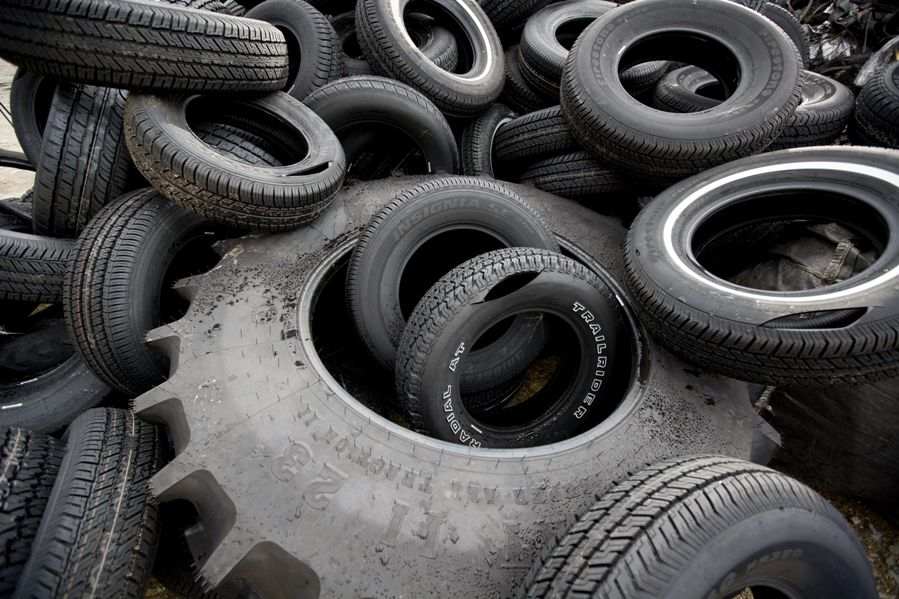
Used tires

The United States disposes of 279 million waste tires each year, representing over 4 million tons of scrap waste. The polymeric materials that tires they are made of do not decompose easily. Even after heavy use and wear, only a few grams are abraded from each tire before they are deemed not serviceable. This means that almost all the material is discarded, and a valuable resource is left to become an environmental pollutant, if dumped.

=== Environmental issues ===
Waste tires are generally discarded after only a small amount of rubber is worn away. Even so, these tires are unfit for further use in the vehicles they were made for. At the same time they are also unwelcome in landfills and have been proven to be an environmental threat.

Tires take a great deal of valuable space in landfills. In addition, they have been known to bubble to the surface of land fills as they tend to trap methane gas. This bubbling can contaminate local water systems, as it can damage the landfill liners that are meant to control contaminants. The different stabilizers and flame retardants added to tires have also been known to kill advantageous bacteria in the soil. Originally, dumping in landfill was the primary form of disposal for scrap rubber (70% in 1977), but due to the decreasing availability of space, this process is no longer considered feasible.

Waste tires create health and environmental challenges. Accumulation of waste tires, which are non-biodegradable polymers due to the presence of fillers, steel cord, organic, and inorganic components, is a major environmental concern.

The dumping of tires in landfills has negative effects on the environment. Not only do they take up a great deal of space, but their process of decomposing has created a wide variety of issues that have made their dumping landfills unfeasible. In many regions, dumping is banned.

The process of bubbling of trapped methane gas has been linked to increased mosquito and other insect breeding (increase risk of disease spreading), contamination of both underground and above ground water systems, as well as chemically destroying many beneficial bacteria that grow in the soil within and surrounding a landfill.

Tires have been stockpiled for years both legally (landfills) and illegally. In the United States alone there are about two billion around the country, with an estimated 279 million to be added to this number in the next few years. The legal stockpiling of tires increases the risk of fires which can burn for months on end, creating further pollution in the air and ground, while the illegal dumping of tires in forests, water ways and empty lots have caused pollution which cannot be regulated.

The most obvious hazard associated with the uncontrolled dumping and accumulation of large amounts of tires outdoors is the potential for large fires which are extremely detrimental to the environment. Once a large pile catches fire, it is very hard, if not impossible, to extinguish.

In 1978, a toxic fire at Wade Dump, a rubber recycling facility in Chester, Pennsylvania, burned out of control for several days and resulted in 43 injured firefighters and criminal charges for the owner of the site. First responders to the fire suffered long-term health consequences and higher than normal cancer rates.

=== Canada ===
In 2010 the Newfoundland and Labrador government proposed that all waste tires in the province be shipped to Corner Brook to be burned and used as fuel. This was quickly delayed and further denied. A stockpile of 1.9 million waste tires in 2010 was a major environmental headache for the government. Environment Minister Ross Wiseman said the Multi-Materials Stewardship Board (MMSB), a provincial agency that promotes recycling, reached agreements with Holcim (Canada) Inc. and Lafarge Canada Inc. They agreed to ship tires to Quebec where they will be burned for energy.

== Fees ==
In most of the United States, a fee is included in every new tire that is sold. Fees can be collected by states, importers, and sellers, the latter being the most common case. These fees are collected to help support tire-recycling programs throughout the states. State tire-recycling programs are created to reduce the amount of scrap tires in stockpiles. The table below shows the tire fees in each state:

State	Tire fee	Reference
Alabama	$1 per tire	
Alaska	$2.50 per tire	
Arizona	2% of retail sales price, up to $2 per tire	
Arkansas	$2 per auto + truck tire, $5 per truck w/rim size greater than 19'	
California	$1.75 per tire	
Colorado	$1.50 per tire	
Connecticut	none (repealed on July 1, 1997)	
Delaware	$2 per tire	
Florida	$1 per tire	
Georgia	$1 per tire	
Hawaii	$1 per tire	
Idaho	none	—N/a
Illinois	$2.50 per tire	
Indiana	$0.25 per tire, trailer tires exempt	
Iowa	$1 per tire	
Kansas	$0.25 per tire	
Kentucky	$1 per tire	
Louisiana	$2 per tire (auto/light truck), $5 per tire (medium truck), $10 per tire (off-road)	
Maine	$1 per tire	
Maryland	$0.80 per tire	
Massachusetts	none	—N/a
Michigan	$1.50 per tire	
Minnesota	none	—N/a
Mississippi	$1 per tire (rim size less than 24'), $2 per tire (rim size greater than 24')	
Missouri	$0.50 per tire	
Montana	none	—N/a
Nebraska	$1 per tire	
Nevada	$1 per tire	
New Hampshire	none	—N/a
New Jersey	$1.50 per tire	
New Mexico	$1.50 per tire	
New York	$2.50 per tire	
North Carolina	2% of cost of tire (rim size = 19.5' or less), 1% of cost of tire (rim size more than 19.5')	
North Dakota	$2 per tire	
Ohio	$1 per tire	
Oklahoma	$1 per tire (rim size 17.5' or less), $2.50 per tire (rim size is greater than 17.5' & less than or equal to 19.5'), $3.50 per tire (rim size greater than 19.5')	
Oregon	none	—N/a
Pennsylvania	$1 per tire	
Rhode Island	$0.50 per tire	
South Carolina	$2 per tire	
South Dakota	$2 per tire	
Tennessee	$1 per tire	
Texas	none	
Utah	$1 per tire (rim size 14' or less), $1.50 per tire (single-bead: rim size is between 14' and 19.5'), $2 per tire (dual-bead: rim size of 19.5'), $2 per tire (single/dual-bead: rim size is between 20' and 26')	
Vermont	none, infeasible	
Virginia	$0.50 per tire	
Washington	$1 per tire	
West Virginia	none	—N/a
Wisconsin	$2 per tire	
Wyoming	none	—N/a

== U.S.-Mexico border issues ==
The region around the Mexico–United States border has failed to manage the stockpiles of waste tires. Some neglectful regions between the U.S. and Mexico border have given up on managing the stockpiles. The lack of waste tire management on the border creates health, fire, and environmental hazards in the area. In 2003, a program was set up and signed and included objectives to help reduce the stockpiles of waste tires in the region between the U.S. and Mexico border. The program was the US-Mexico Border 2012 Program. This program had a goal to clean the three biggest waste tire stockpiles that were located in the region. In 2004, the US-Mexico Bi-national Commission expressed its strategies for dealing with the waste tire problem in the region, signing a letter in November 2004. The Bi-national program's target objective was "to develop and cooperate on an environmentally sustainable, comprehensive scrap tire management strategy." The US-Mexico Border 2012 Program is the third initiated bi-national agreement that aimed to protect the public health and environment that was in the shared region between the U.S. and Mexico border. This program was initiated by the United States Environmental Protection Agency and Mexico's Secretaria de Medio Ambiente y Recursos Naturales. The updated US-Mexico Border 2020 Program accepts that one of the challenges it faces is the waste-tire management problem that has occurred over the past.
