= Playground surfacing =

Material under playground equipment

A playground surface is the material that lies under and around swings, slides, monkey bars and other playground equipment. The surfaces are usually made of wood or rubber and designed specifically for aesthetics, child safety, and/or ADA wheelchair accessibility. Playground safety surfacing often involves the use of recycled rubber tire products such as poured rubber, rubber tiles or loose rubber mulch.

== Playground surface feature comparison ==
Surface type	ASTM 1292 protection	ADA accessible	Cost range/sq.ft.	Drainage	Fall height protection
Poured rubber surfacing (flooring)	Yes	Yes	High	Yes	
Playground rubber tiles	Yes	Yes	High	Yes	
Artificial turf grass	Yes	Yes	High	Yes	
Rubber mulch	Yes	Yes	Medium	Yes^{1}	14 feet^{5}
Grass/dirt	No	Yes	Low	No	
Concrete	No	Yes	High	No	
Asphalt	No	Yes	Medium	No	
Gravel/stones	No	No	Medium	Yes	
Sand	No	No	Low	No	
Engineered wood fiber	Yes	Yes	Low	Yes^{1}	6 feet^{5}
Wood chips or bark mulch	Unclear	No	Low	Yes^{1}	2.4 m^{6}
ATP^{4} + foam	Yes	Yes	High	Yes	
Two layer system (tiles with rubber base)	Yes	Yes	High	Yes	

1. Applies only if a drainage system is installed.

2 Ability to meet standards varies with installation materials and methods.

3. EPDM refers to Ethylene Propylene Monomer, a firm, yet flexible, rubber material.

4. ATP refers to Aliphatic Thermoplastic Polyurethane, a firm, yet flexible, plastic in which sphere-like particles are chemically bonded to a color-fast binding material.

5. When properly installed with a 6-in depth.

6. Optimisation of the Shock Attenuation Properties of Playground Surfaces

== Safety ==
In the United States, playground-related injuries send 200,000 children to an emergency room every year. If visits to doctors are included, the figure rises to 500,000 injuries, according to the American Academy of Orthopedic Surgeons. More than half of these injuries result from falls to a playground surface that can cause fractures, concussions, dislocations, and internal injuries. Recognizing these facts, many organizations, including the Consumer Product Safety Commission, have issued guidelines and standards for playground surfaces.

== Testing methods and standards ==
ASTM International has issued what it calls the “ASTM Standard Specification for Impact Attenuation of Surface Systems Under and Around Playground Equipment”, which is known by its numerical designation, F1292. This standard accounts for both the deceleration of the head during impact and the length of time the head takes to stop moving. The test simulates the impact of a child’s head hitting the surface from various heights of the playground equipment.

== Accessibility ==
In the United States, as well as being safe, a playground surface should be firm enough to meet the requirements of the Americans with Disabilities Act, which means it must offer easy mobility for children in wheelchairs. Meeting these dual objectives limits the number of types of surfaces that can be considered by responsible playground owner/operators. ASTM International has developed test method F1951 to evaluate compliance with the Americans With Disability Act (ADA). However, meeting the ADA's requirements does not guarantee that all children with disabilities can use the playground equipment.

As the table above makes clear, some surfaces commonly used do not provide adequate protection from the effects of falling, or may not offer adequate wheelchair access. The American Academy of Orthopedic Surgeons states, “Soil, packed dirt, grass, and turf are not recommended for surfacing.” A thick layer of lush green grass, moist from recent rains, may seem soft enough. But in practice, the grass wears away and either turns to mud in wet weather or dries to a hard crust in dry weather.

== Common surfaces ==
- Engineered wood fiber (EWF): This material consists of shredded wood into sizes and aspect ratios determined by a series of specified sieves. The wood chips are springy enough to meet ASTM F1292 for impact attenuation and firm enough to meet ASTM F1951 for wheelchair access. Engineered wood fiber is made from biodegradable virgin wood. A wood fiber surface tends to compact over time and needs to be topped off every two to three years.
- Poured rubber surfacing: This is a seamless rubber surface composed of two layers that is poured in place (PIP). The first layer, or "wear layer", is typically 3/8 inch (9.5 mm) thick and made of EPDM or TPV granules. The second layer, or "cushion layer", is 1–5 inches (25–127 mm) thick and made of crumb rubber or recycled rubber tires. The surface's thickness depends upon usage and play equipment with 15–20 mm for hard surfaces and 40 mm for compressed stone. The raw rubber particles are bound together with a polyurethane binder and mixed or made on-site. The surface comes in a wide range of colors and even mixtures of colors. A typical poured rubber surface meets national standards for safety and ADA wheelchair accessibility.
- ATP rubberized unitary surface: ATP stands for aliphatic thermoplastic monomer. This surface also meets safety and accessibility standards. It consists of a layer of almost-spherical rubber particles, about one-sixteenth of an inch in diameter, which are chemically bound by a color-fast binder. This surface, in turn, is bonded to a layer of engineered recycled foam (ERF) to absorb shock. The colors are vibrant, and they will not fade from the sun or power washing. As with PIP, its main disadvantage is high cost. But this limitation is somewhat offset by long life: data from Europe and the U.S. indicate these surfaces have a useful life of at least 10 years.
- Shredded rubber: This material consists of tires shredded into pieces about 1 by 1/8 inch (25 mm × 3 mm). The loose particles are spread on the playground surface where they absorb shock effectively and meets the ASTM F1292 standard. But there are certain drawbacks. The material moves around in a playground as children play, creating an uneven surface that is not wheelchair accessible. Wear areas under swings and at the base of slides are particularly prone to scuffing out. When this occurs, the thickness of the shredded rubber surface may not be enough to cushion falls from originally specified heights. There is also a risk of fire. Only a small number of such fires are reported each year, but they are apt to be extremely hot and may not respond to conventional fire-fighting equipment. When this occurs, the playground equipment above the surface may be totally destroyed.
- Sand and gravel: The extent to which these surfaces meet safety standards depends on the exact type and depth of the material used. When sand is wet, the surface becomes hard and unyielding. In such a condition, the ability of a sand surface to absorb impact is seriously compromised. Neither sand nor pea gravel meet the requirements of the Americans with Disabilities Act for wheelchair accessibility.

== Role of IPEMA ==
In the United States and Canada the International Play Equipment Manufacturers Association (IPEMA) provides a third-party certification service enabled by appointing a testing laboratory to determine if a particular surface conforms to ASTM standards F1292, F1951, and F2075. IPEMA’s seal on a provider’s document is clear evidence that the covered material has met these tests. Owner/operators should request a copy of this certification for their own protection. Some suppliers do not offer proof of certification and mere membership in IPEMA does not mean that a particular supplier’s material has been certified. A list of certified suppliers can be found at www.ipema.org.
