= Blechynden Terrace Park =

Coordinates: 50°54′28″N 1°24′42″W

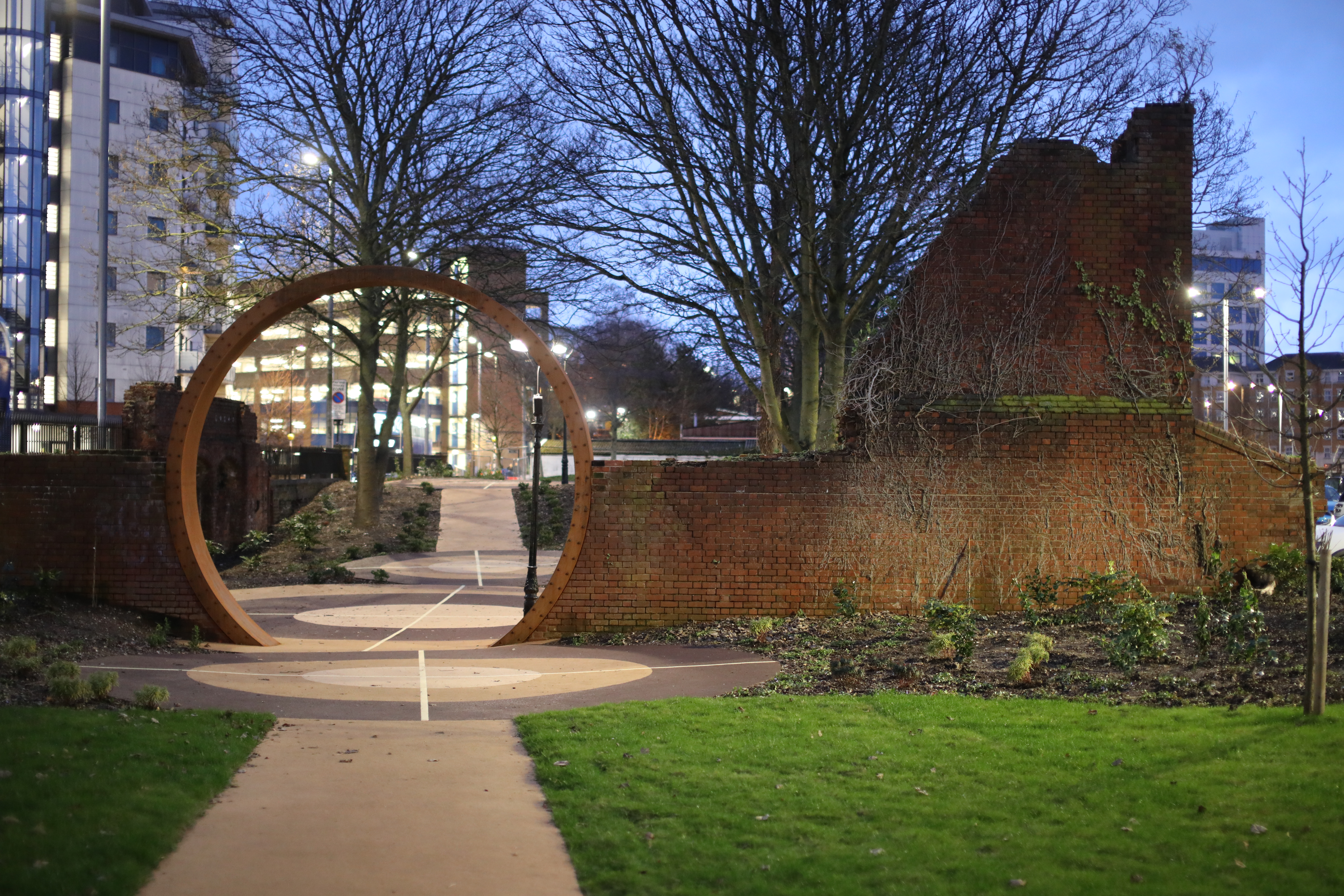
Blechynden Terrace Park at twilight

Blechynden Terrace Park or Blechynden Gardens is a park in Southampton, Hampshire, England. It lies within the remains of the Emperia Building, which was destroyed by German bombing during World War II.

As part of a 2018 beautification scheme. a 4.9m corten steel arch was placed over the main path through the park. The arch is in part meant to act as a memorial to the Southampton Blitz. Paths through the park were surfaced with rubber crumb and a screen was erected to block the view of a neighbouring car-park. The screen is made of corten steel and shows the Southampton shoreline prior to land reclamation in the area.
