= 2021 Sioux Chief PowerPEX 200 =

Race details
- Race 19 of 20 of the 2021 ARCA Menards Series; Race 10 of 10 of the 2021 Sioux Chief Showdown
- Date: October 2, 2021
- Official name: 25th Annual Sioux Chief PowerPEX 200
- Location: Salem, Indiana, Salem Speedway
- Course: Permanent racing facility
- Course length: 0.555 miles (0.893 km)
- Distance: 200 laps, 111 mi (179 km)
- Scheduled distance: 200 laps, 111 mi (179 km)
- Average speed: 78.307 miles per hour (126.023 km/h)

Pole position
Driver	Ty Gibbs	Joe Gibbs Racing
- Time: 17.176

Most laps led
Driver	Ty Gibbs	Joe Gibbs Racing
- Laps: 155

Winner
No. 15	Jesse Love	Venturini Motorsports

Television in the United States
- Network: MAVTV
- Announcers: Bob Dillner, Jim Trebow

Radio in the United States
- Radio: ARCA Racing Network

The 2021 Sioux Chief PowerPEX 200 presented by Scott County Tourism was the 19th stock car race of the 2021 ARCA Menards Series, the tenth and final race of the 2021 Sioux Chief Showdown, and the 25th iteration of the event. The race was held on Saturday, October 2, 2021, in Salem, Indiana at Salem Speedway, a 0.555 miles (0.893 km) permanent paved oval-shaped racetrack. The race took the scheduled 200 laps to complete. On the final restart on lap 156, Jesse Love of Venturini Motorsports would take the lead and lead every lap afterwards to win his first career ARCA Menards Series win and his only win of the season. Meanwhile, Ty Gibbs of Joe Gibbs Racing, who would finish second, would win the 2021 Sioux Chief Showdown championship, winning the championship by 22 points. To fill out the podium, Rajah Caruth of Rev Racing would finish third.

== Background ==
Salem Speedway is a .555 miles (0.893 km) long paved oval motor racetrack in Washington Township, Washington County, near Salem, Indiana, approximately 100 miles (160 km) south of Indianapolis. The track has 33° degrees of banking in the corners. Major auto racing series that run at Salem are ARCA and USAC.

=== Entry list ===
#	Driver	Team	Make	Sponsor
01	Willie Mullins	Fast Track Racing	Ford	CW Metals, Crow Wing Recycling
2	Nick Sanchez	Rev Racing	Chevrolet	Universal Technical Institute, NASCAR Technical Institute
6	Rajah Caruth	Rev Racing	Chevrolet	Universal Technical Institute, Sunoco
06	A. J. Moyer	Wayne Peterson Racing	Ford	JRC Transportation, Great Railing
10	Ed Pompa	Fast Track Racing	Toyota	Menards Frank Kimmel Throwback, Double "H" Ranch
11	Mason Mingus	Fast Track Racing	Ford	Team Construction Harry Gant Throwback
12	Ken Schrader	Fast Track Racing	Toyota	Fast Track Racing
15	Jesse Love	Venturini Motorsports	Toyota	Mobil 1
17	Taylor Gray	David Gilliland Racing	Ford	Ripper Coffee Company
18	Ty Gibbs	Joe Gibbs Racing	Toyota	Joe Gibbs Racing
20	Corey Heim	Venturini Motorsports	Toyota	Craftsman
21	Kody Swanson	GMS Racing	Chevrolet	Cunningham, GMS Fabrication
25	Gracie Trotter	Venturini Motorsports	Toyota	Calico Coatings
27	Zachary Tinkle	Richmond Clubb Motorsports	Toyota	Indiana Owned
30	Landen Lewis	Rette Jones Racing	Ford	Plants Direct, 19th Green
46	Jean-Philippe Bergeron	David Gilliland Racing	Ford	Prolon Controls, Technoflex
48	Brad Smith	Brad Smith Motorsports	Chevrolet	Henshaw Automation
69	Will Kimmel	Kimmel Racing	Toyota	Clarksville Schwinn
Official entry list

== Practice ==
The only 45-minute practice session was held on Saturday, October 2, at 3:15 PM EST. Ty Gibbs of Joe Gibbs Racing would set the fastest time in the session, with a lap of 17.202 and an average speed of 116.149 miles per hour (186.924 km/h).

Pos.	#	Driver	Team	Make	Time	Speed
1	18	Ty Gibbs	Joe Gibbs Racing	Toyota	17.202	116.149
2	20	Corey Heim	Venturini Motorsports	Toyota	17.359	115.099
3	17	Taylor Gray	David Gilliland Racing	Ford	17.391	114.887
Full practice results

== Qualifying ==
Qualifying was held on Saturday, October 2, at 5:30 PM EST. Each driver would have two laps to set their fastest lap; whichever lap was fastest would be considered their official lap time. Ty Gibbs of Joe Gibbs Racing would win the pole, setting a lap of 17.176 and an average speed of 116.325 miles per hour (187.207 km/h).

=== Full qualifying results ===
Pos.	#	Driver	Team	Make	Time	Speed
1	18	Ty Gibbs	Joe Gibbs Racing	Toyota	17.176	116.325
2	17	Taylor Gray	David Gilliland Racing	Ford	17.206	116.122
3	2	Nick Sanchez	Rev Racing	Chevrolet	17.297	115.511
4	15	Jesse Love	Venturini Motorsports	Toyota	17.307	115.445
5	20	Corey Heim	Venturini Motorsports	Toyota	17.345	115.192
6	69	Will Kimmel	Kimmel Racing	Toyota	17.416	114.722
7	46	Jean-Philippe Bergeron	David Gilliland Racing	Ford	17.427	114.650
8	30	Landen Lewis	Rette Jones Racing	Ford	17.505	114.139
9	25	Gracie Trotter	Venturini Motorsports	Toyota	17.517	114.061
10	11	Mason Mingus	Fast Track Racing	Ford	17.520	114.041
11	21	Kody Swanson	GMS Racing	Chevrolet	17.547	113.866
12	6	Rajah Caruth	Rev Racing	Chevrolet	17.591	113.581
13	12	Ken Schrader	Fast Track Racing	Toyota	17.654	113.175
14	01	Willie Mullins	Fast Track Racing	Ford	17.865	111.839
15	27	Zachary Tinkle	Richmond Clubb Motorsports	Toyota	17.896	111.645
16	10	Ed Pompa	Fast Track Racing	Toyota	18.460	108.234
17	48	Brad Smith	Brad Smith Motorsports	Chevrolet	19.591	101.986
18	06	A. J. Moyer	Wayne Peterson Racing	Ford	20.151	99.151
Official qualifying results

== Race results ==
Fin	St	#	Driver	Team	Make	Laps	Led	Status	Pts
1	4	15	Jesse Love	Venturini Motorsports	Toyota	200	45	running	47
2	1	18	Ty Gibbs	Joe Gibbs Racing	Toyota	200	155	running	44
3	12	6	Rajah Caruth	Rev Racing	Chevrolet	200	0	running	41
4	6	69	Will Kimmel	Kimmel Racing	Toyota	200	0	running	40
5	9	25	Gracie Trotter	Venturini Motorsports	Toyota	200	0	running	39
6	10	11	Mason Mingus	Fast Track Racing	Ford	199	0	running	38
7	5	20	Corey Heim	Venturini Motorsports	Toyota	199	0	running	37
8	7	46	Jean-Philippe Bergeron	David Gilliland Racing	Ford	198	0	running	36
9	11	21	Kody Swanson	GMS Racing	Chevrolet	197	0	running	35
10	13	12	Ken Schrader	Fast Track Racing	Toyota	197	0	running	34
11	2	17	Taylor Gray	David Gilliland Racing	Ford	197	0	running	33
12	14	01	Willie Mullins	Fast Track Racing	Ford	195	0	running	32
13	8	30	Landen Lewis	Rette Jones Racing	Ford	194	0	running	31
14	16	10	Ed Pompa	Fast Track Racing	Toyota	192	0	running	30
15	18	06	A. J. Moyer	Wayne Peterson Racing	Ford	176	0	running	29
16	17	48	Brad Smith	Brad Smith Motorsports	Chevrolet	141	0	electrical	28
17	3	2	Nick Sanchez	Rev Racing	Chevrolet	45	0	crash	27
18	15	27	Zachary Tinkle	Richmond Clubb Motorsports	Toyota	39	0	crash	26
Official race results

Previous race: 2021 Bush's Beans 200	ARCA Menards Series; 2021 season	Next race: 2021 Reese's 150
