= Norsk Dekkretur =

Norwegian tire recycler

Norsk Dekkretur AS
- Type: Non-profit
- Industry: Tire recycling
- Founded: 1994; 32 years ago
- Headquarters: Oslo, Norway
- Area served: Norway
- Website: http://www.dekkretur.no

Norsk Dekkretur AS, trading as Dekkretur, is a non-profit company responsible for managing tire recycling in Norway. It holds a de facto monopoly on this task. It collects an environmental fee on all tires sold in Norway. This is used to pay for the collection, transport and recycling of 60,000 tonnes of tires per year after they are discarded. The company was founded in 1994 and is owned by Dekkimportørenes Forening and the Norwegian Automobile Importers’ Association.

== Organization ==
Norwegian legislation makes it illegal to through tires on landfills, and mandates that they are suitably recycled. All dealers of tires are required to accept discarded tires for free, within a reasonable amount and within the categories they retail. Importers and producers are similarly required to pick up discarded tires from all parts of the country where they are sold.

Norsk Dekkretur is an non-profit aksjeselskap (limited company) owned by Dekkimportørenes Forening (75 percent) and the Norwegian Automobile Importers’ Association (25 percent). It operates with an agreement with the Ministry of the Environment.

The company subcontracts the collection, transportation, sorting and recycling of tires throughout Norway. It collects statistics and had an audited trail for what happens with the tires. Norsk Dekkretur is an entirely management company. The actually operative parts are carried out by a subcontractor.

Dekkretur has an agreement with the Norwegian Customs Service for charging an environmental fee on all imported tires to Norway. The fee is set by Norsk Dekkretur at a level to cover the company's cost. The fee is levied on the importer, who is free to forward the fees to dealers and end users. In most cases this is done through a specification on the final invoice to the end customer.

Dekkretur has a de facto monopoly on the system to recycle tires, but does not have a de jure monopoly position. In theory, a competing system could be established to conduct the same task.

== History ==
Norsk Dekkretur was established in 1994, following new legislation which made it illegal to throw tires on landfill. A similar system had existed in Sweden since 1974.

Since 2001, the company has contracted the transport and actual recycling of tires to Ragn-Sells, who operate a tire recycling facility at Skjerkøya in Bamble Municipality. Ragn-Sells is a nation-wide waste management and collection company, and also handles the pick-up and transport of the tires to the facility from 4000 sites (deales, recycling centers, car wreckers etc. For the seven-year contract from 2019, Ragn-Sells was compensated 100 million kroner per year.

In November 2024 a tire fire broke out at Ragn-Sells facility in Bamble, with several hundred thousand tires caught on fire. Putting out the fire took two weeks. The cost of the fire was 14 million kroner for Grenland Brann og Redning alone. In addition, the towboat company Buksér & Berging had costs of 15 million kroner.

In October 2025, Dekkretur announced that they would not renew the contract with Ragn-Sells. Instead, they teamed up with their Swedish counterpart, Svensk Däckåtervinning, and became a partial owner of their operating company, Bon Orbit. This resulted in a new facility being established in an old Saab factory in Trollhättan, Sweden, which opened on 1 September 2026. The new facility has 35 employees.
