= Technoflex =

Technoflex International
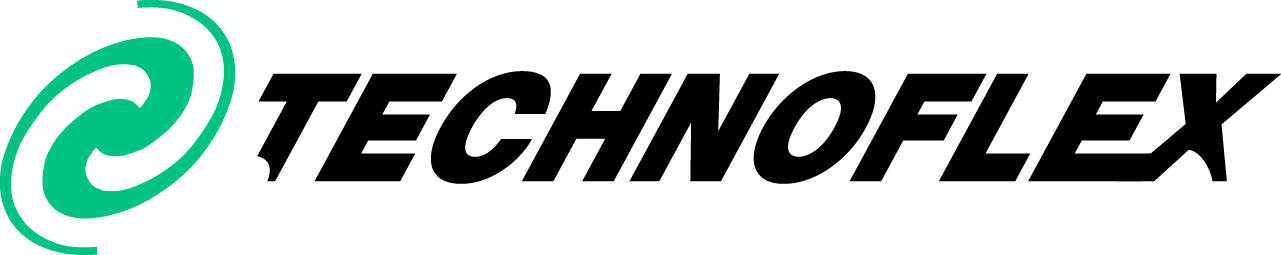
- Company type: Private
- Industry: Consumer Products
- Founded: 1993
- Founders: Pierre Bourgeois; Jean-Luc Hébert
- Headquarters: Bois-des-Filion, Quebec, Canada
- Area served: Worldwide
- Key people: Eric Beausejour (President); Robert Lacoste (Executive Vice President)
- Number of employees: 50 (2019)
- Subsidiaries: Dura Undercushions
- Website: www.technoflexintl.com

Technoflex International, Inc. (commonly named Technoflex) is a Canadian company headquartered in Bois-des-Filion, Canada that designs, develops and distributes products made from 100% recycled post-consumer materials. The company was founded in 1993 in Longueuil, Canada by former CEO Jean-Luc Hebert and Pierre Bourgeois.

== History ==
In 2009, Technoflex became part of a private Canadian consortium. The new owners aimed to position Technoflex as a market leader in their industry sector. A year later, in 2010, the head office and the manufacturing operations of Technoflex moved to a new facility on Montreal’s North Shore to make room for future growth. In 2014, Technoflex created a partnership with CCPME (Desjardins Development capital) to promote its growth by financing some of its operations with Desjardins Group development capital. CCPME is an investment fund that provides Québec SMEs patient capital to support them in their expansion, R&D and business acquisition.

== Industry Sectors ==
=== Retail ===
The core business of Technoflex is retail. They mainly manufacture and distribute retail products for the end consumer to home improvement retailers all around the globe such as Lowe's, Canadian Tire, Rona, Inc., Brico Dépôt, Castorama and much more. Technoflex begins its first commercializing activities with the Secure Step, an anti-slip stair tread made of recycled rubber tires.

=== Traffic Safety ===
The second core business of Technoflex is traffic safety. They manufacture and distribute traffic safety products such as speed bumps, speed humps, parking curbs, signalling bases and much more to specialized companies in Canada and United States.

== See also ==
- Rubber recycling
- Plastic recycling
- Rubber mulch
- Plastic mulch
- Compression moulding
- Injection moulding
- Vulcanization
- Waste management
