= Tire-derived fuel =

Recycled tires burned as fuel

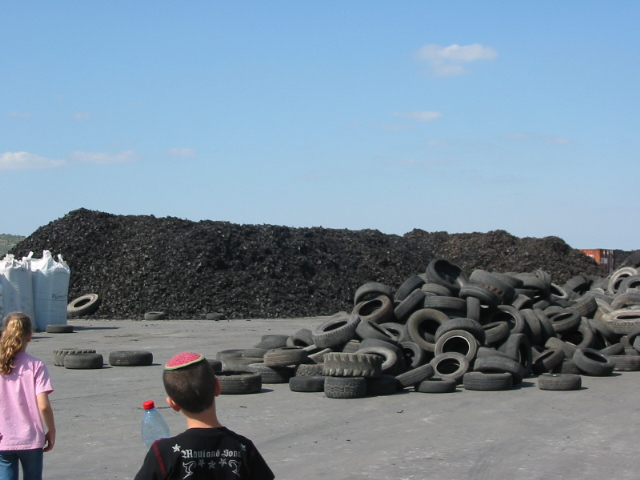
Used tires in foreground waiting to be shredded and shredded tires in background.

Tire-derived fuel (TDF) is composed of shredded scrap tires. Tires may be mixed with coal or other fuels, such as wood or chemical wastes, to be burned in concrete kilns, power plants, or paper mills. An EPA test program concluded that, with the exception of zinc emissions, potential emissions from TDF are not expected to be very much different from other conventional fossil fuels, as long as combustion occurs in a well-designed, well-operated and well-maintained combustion device.

In the United States in 2017, about 43% of scrap tires (1,736,340 tons or 106 million tires) were burnt as tire-derived fuel. Cement manufacturing was the largest user of TDF, at 46%, pulp and paper manufacturing used 29% and electric utilities used 25%. Another 25% of scrap tires were used to make ground rubber, 17% were disposed of in landfills and 16% had other uses.

== Theory ==
Historically, there has not been any volume use for scrap tires other than burning that has been able to keep up with the volume of waste generated yearly. Tires produce the same energy as petroleum and approximately 25% more energy than coal. Burning tires is lower on the hierarchy of reducing waste than recycling, but it is better than placing the tire waste in a landfill or dump, where there is a possibility for uncontrolled tire fires or the harboring of disease vectors such as mosquitoes. Tire Derived Fuel is an interim solution to the scrap tire waste problem. Advances in tire recycling technology might one day provide a solution other than burning by reusing tire derived material in high volume applications.

== Characteristics ==
Tire derived fuel is usually consumed in the form of shredded or chipped material with most of the metal wire from the tire's steel belts removed. The analytical properties of this refined material are published in TDF Produced From Scrap Tires with 96+% Wire Removed.

Tires are typically composed of about 1 to 1.5% Zinc oxide, which is a well known component used in the manufacture of tires and is also toxic to aquatic and plant life. The chlorine content in tires is due primarily to the chlorinated butyl rubber liner that slows the leak rate of air. The Rubber Manufacturers Association (RMA) is a very good source for compositional data and other information on tires. The use of TDF for heat production is controversial due to the possibility for toxin production. Reportedly, polychlorinated dibenzodioxins and furans are produced during the combustion process and there is supportive evidence to suggest that this is true under some incineration conditions. Other toxins such as NOx, SOx and heavy metals are also produced, though whether these levels of toxins are higher or lower than conventional coal and oil fired incinerators is not clear.

== Environmental impact ==
While environmental controversy surrounding use of this fuel is wide and varied, the greatest supported evidence of toxicity comes from the presence of dioxins and furans in the flue gases. Zinc has also been found to dissolve into storm water, from shredded rubber, at acutely toxic levels for aquatic life and plants.

A study of dioxin and furan content of stack gasses at a variety of cement mills, paper mills, boilers, and power plants conducted in the 1990s shows a wide and inconsistent variation in dioxin and furan output when fueled partially by TDF as compared to the same facilities powered by only coal. Some facilities added as little as 4% TDF and experienced as much as a 4,140% increase in dioxin and furan emissions. Other facilities added as much as 30% TDF and experienced dioxin and furan emissions increases of only as much as 58%. Still other facilities used as much as 8% TDF and experienced a decrease of as much as 83% of dioxin and furan emissions. One facility conducted four tests with two tests resulting in decreased emissions and two resulting in increased emissions. Another facility also conducted four tests and had widely varying increases in emissions.

A 2004 study showed that huge polyaromatic emissions are generated from combustion of tire rubber, at a minimum, 2 orders of magnitude higher than coal alone. The study concludes with, "atmospheric contamination dramatically increases when tire rubber is used as the fuel. Other different combustion variables compared to the ones used for coal combustion should be used to avoid atmospheric contamination by toxic, mutagenic, and carcinogenic pollutants, as well as hot-gas cleaning systems and COx capture systems."
