= Tire-derived aggregate =

Building material

Tire-derived aggregate (TDA) is a building material made of recycled tires, which are shredded into pieces of varying sizes. It is commonly used in construction projects because it is sustainable and lightweight, along with being less expensive than many competing available materials. In 2007, an estimated 561.6 thousand tons (about 509 thousand metric tons) of TDA were produced. This accounted for about 12 percent of the total recycled tire material used. Particle sizes less than 12mm are considered crumb rubber.

Applications:

- Stormwater management due to high permeability
- Road fill to improve weak soil and reduce frost heave in cold climates
- Landfilling due to permeability for leachate and gas collection
- Slope stabilization due to lower hydrostatic pressure than soil
- Vibration mitigation due to absorption capacity
- Backfill for driveways, septic tanks, sidewalks, basements, etc.
- Soft surfaces for walking paths, playgrounds, etc.
