= Tire recycling =

Reuse of waste tires

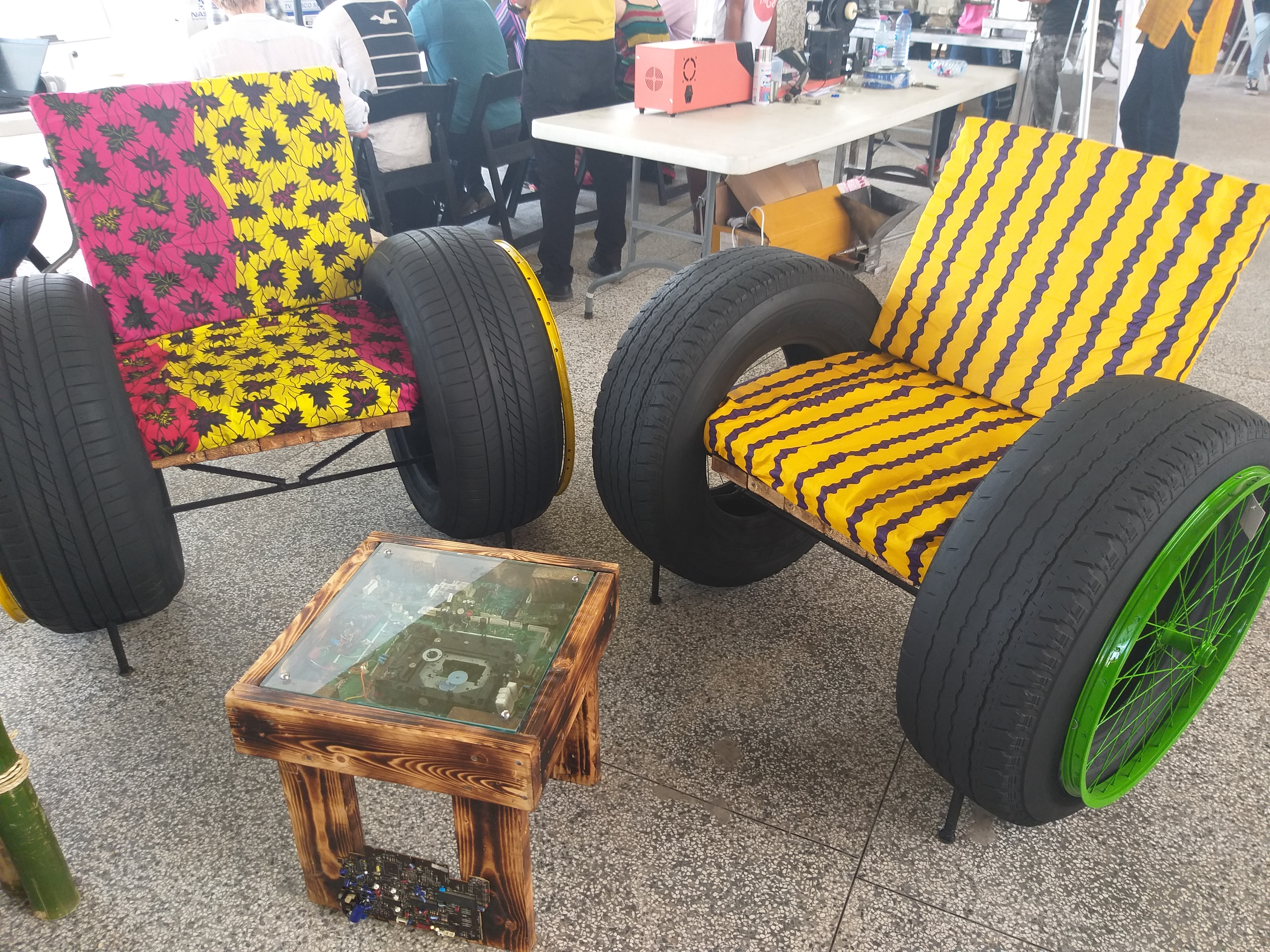
Tire arm chair

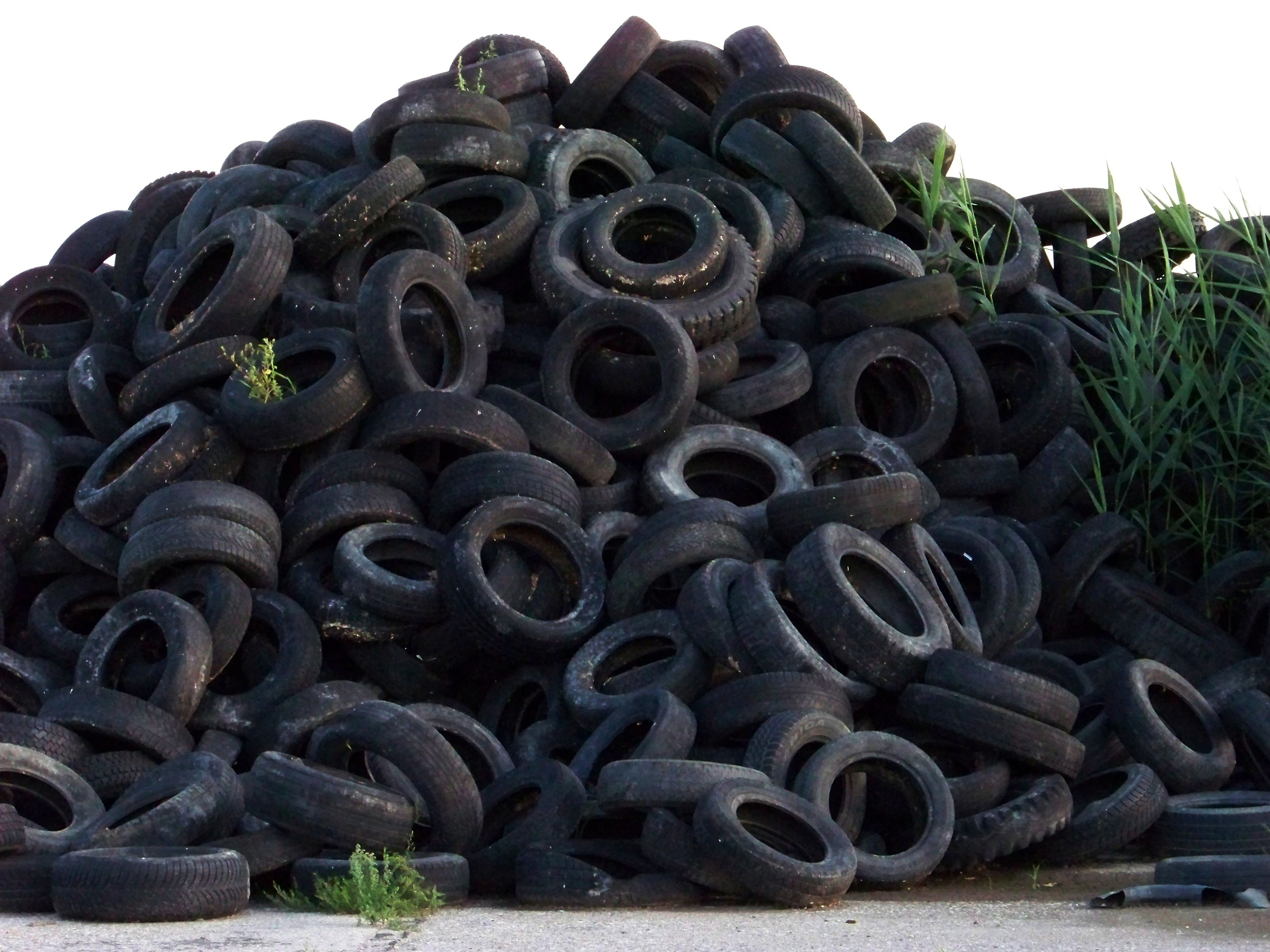
Tires are among the most problematic sources of waste. Progress in recycling has resulted in a major reduction in dumping.

Tire recycling, or rubber recycling, is the process of recycling waste tires that are no longer suitable for use on vehicles due to wear or irreparable damage. These tires are a challenging source of waste, due to the large volume produced, the durability of the tires, and the components in the tire that are ecologically problematic.

Because tires are highly durable and non-biodegradable, they can consume valuable space in landfills. If waste tires are improperly managed they may cause rubber pollution. In 1990, it was estimated that over 1 billion scrap tires were in stockpiles in the United States. As of 2015, only 67 million tires remain in stockpiles. From 1994 to 2010, the European Union increased the amount of tires recycled from 25% of annual discards to nearly 95%, with roughly half of the end-of-life tires used for energy, mostly in cement manufacturing.

Pyrolysis and devulcanization could facilitate recycling. Aside from use as fuel, the main end use for tires remains ground crumb rubber. In 2017, 13% of U.S. tires removed from their primary use were sold in the used tire market. Of the tires that were scrapped, 43% were burnt as tire-derived fuel, with cement manufacturing the largest user, another 25% were used to make ground rubber, 8% were used in civil engineering projects, 17% were disposed of in landfills and 8% had other uses. Globally, tire graveyards are a common environmental hazard, with significant pollutants and other challenges. For example, the Sulaibiya tire graveyard in Kuwait has had repeat highly toxic fires.

== Tire life cycle ==
The tire life cycle can be recognized through the following steps:

1. Product developments and innovations such as improved compounds and camber tire shaping increase tire life, increments of replacement, consumer safety, and reduce tire waste.
2. Proper manufacturing and quality of delivery reduces waste at production.
3. Direct distribution through retailers, reduces inventory time and ensures that the life span and the safety of the products are explained to customers.
4. Consumers' use and maintenance choices like tire rotation and alignment affect tire wear and safety of operation.
5. Manufacturers and retailers set policies on return, retread, and replacement to reduce the waste generated from tires and assume responsibility for taking the 'tire to its grave' or to its reincarnation.
6. Recycling tires by developing strategies that combust or process waste into new products, creates viable businesses, and fulfilling public policies.

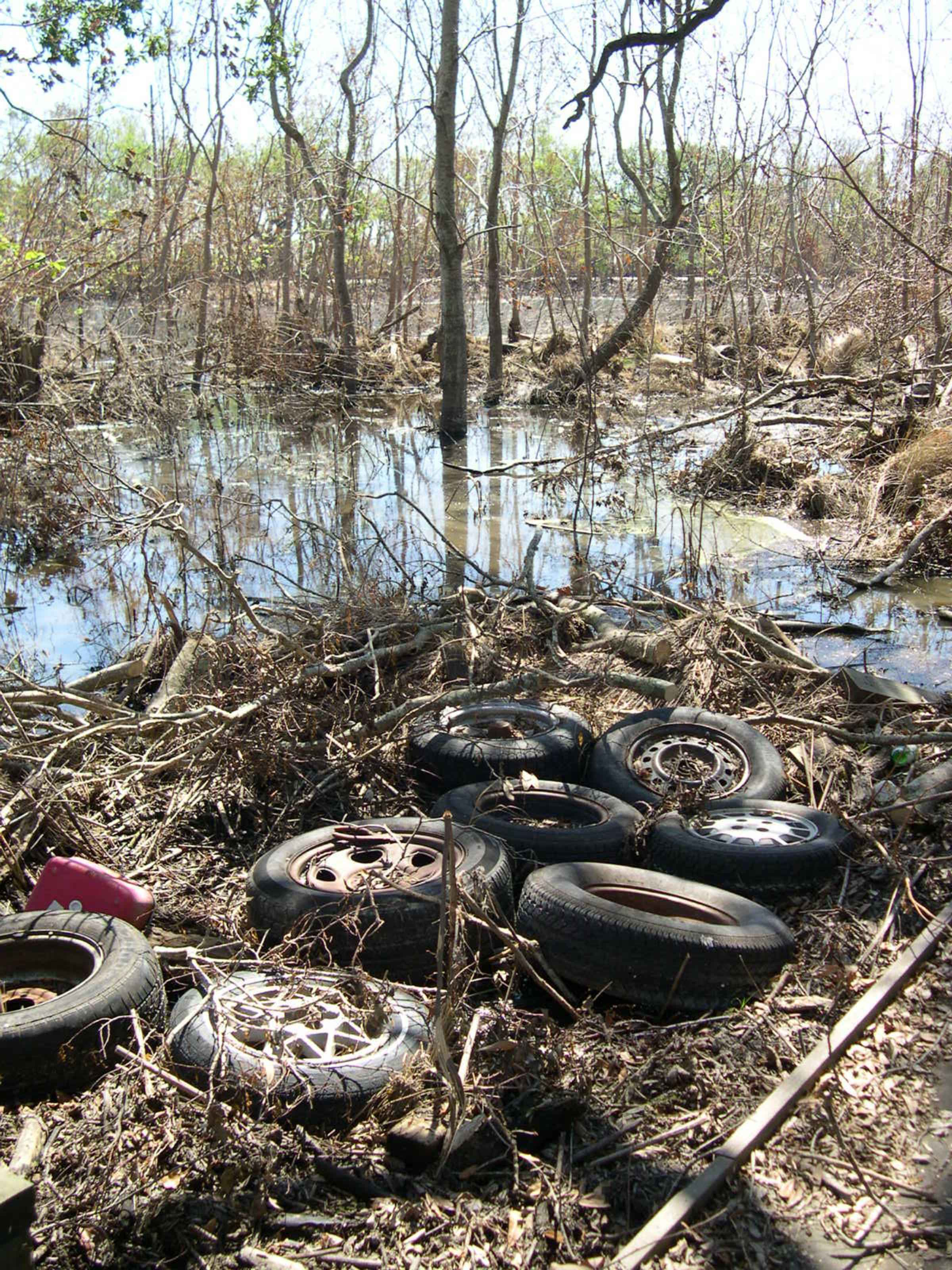
Tires in a natural area after Hurricane Katrina created debris. Tires left in landfills and other waste retention areas are likely to enter the environment during flooding or other extreme weather events.

== Landfill disposal ==
Tires are not desired at landfills, due to their large volumes and 75% void space. Tires can trap methane gases, causing them to become buoyant, or bubble to the surface. This 'bubbling' effect can damage landfill liners that have been installed to help keep landfill contaminants from polluting local surface and ground water. The EU Landfill Directive prohibits the disposal of used tires in landfill.

Shredded tires are now being used in landfills, replacing other construction materials, for a lightweight back-fill in gas venting systems, leachate collection systems, and operational liners. Shredded tire material may also be used to cap, close, or daily cover landfill sites. Scrap tires as a back-fill and cover material are also more cost-effective, since tires can be shredded on-site instead of hauling in other fill materials.

== Stockpiles and legal dumping ==
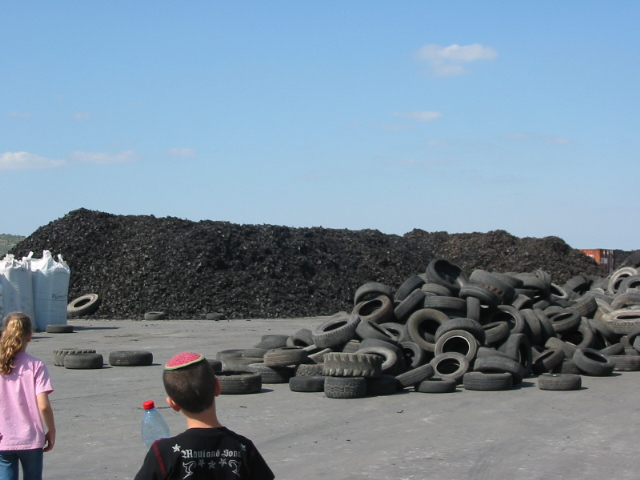
Used tires in the foreground, waiting to be shredded. A pile of shredded tires in the background.

Tire stockpiles create a great health and safety risk. Tire fires can easily occur, burning for long periods, up to a month and also creating substantial pollution in the air and ground. Recycling helps to reduce the number of tires in storage. An additional health risk, tire piles provide harborage for vermin and a breeding ground for mosquitoes that may carry diseases. Illegal dumping of scrap tires pollutes ravines, woods, deserts, and empty lots; which has led many states to pass scrap tire regulations requiring proper management. Tire amnesty day events, in which community members can deposit a limited number of waste tires free of charge, can be funded by state scrap tire programs, helping decrease illegal dumping and improper storage of scrap tires.

Tire storage and recycling are sometimes linked with illegal activities and lack of environmental awareness.

== Uses ==
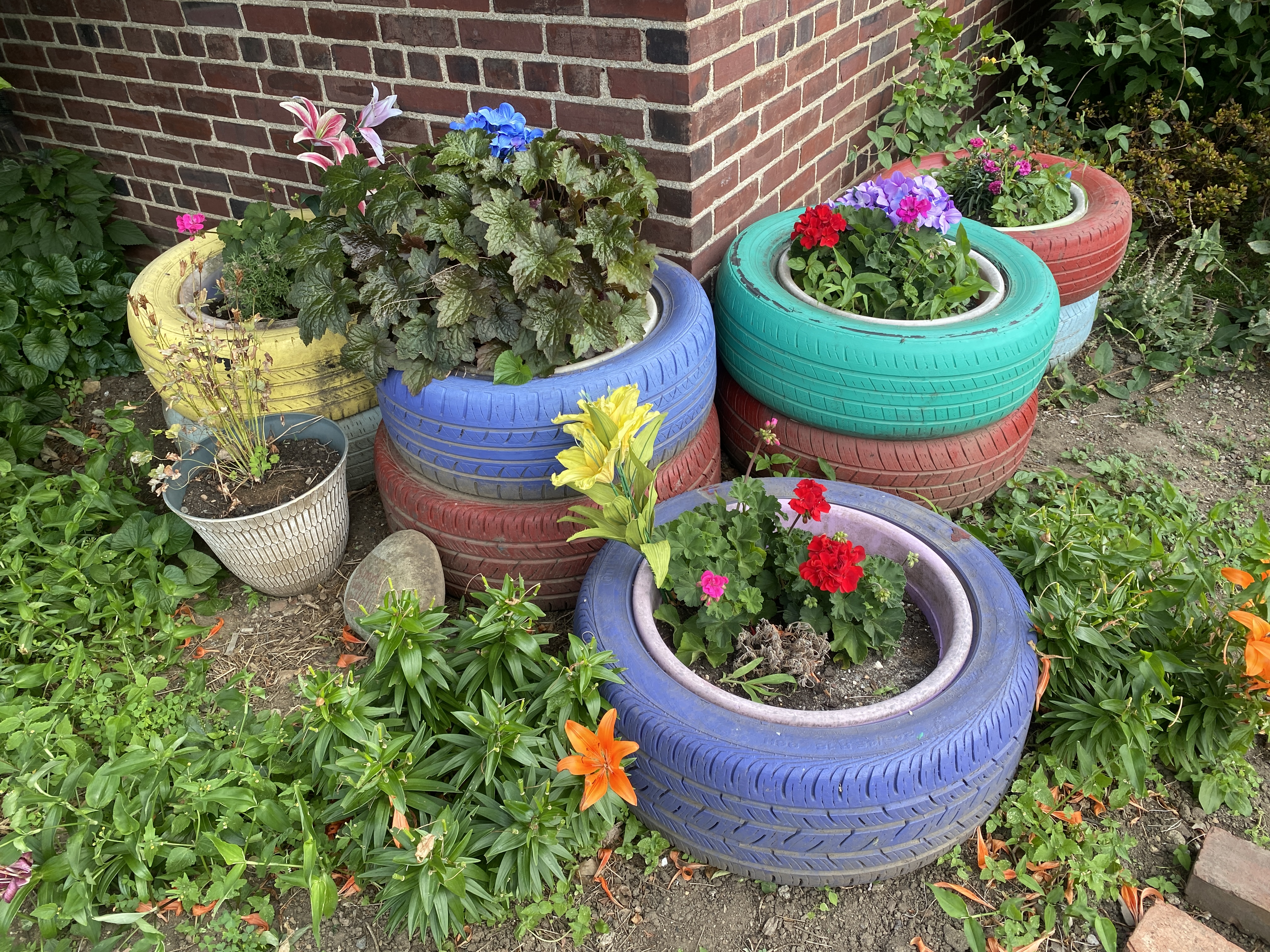
Tire flower planters in Queens, NY

Although tires are usually burnt, not recycled, efforts are continuing to find value. Tires can be reclaimed into, among other things, hot-melt asphalt, typically as crumb rubber modifier—recycled asphalt pavement (CRM—RAP), and as an aggregate in Portland cement concrete Efforts have been made to use recycled tires as raw material for new tires, but such tires may integrate recycled materials no more than 5% by weight, and tires that contain recycled material are inferior to new tires, suffering from reduced tread life and lower traction. Tires have also been cut up and used in garden beds as bark mulch to hold in the water and to prevent weeds from growing. Some "green" buildings, both private and public, have been made from old tires.

Pyrolysis can be used to reprocess the tires into fuel gas, oils, solid residue (char), and low-grade carbon black, which cannot be used in tire manufacture. A pyrolysis method which produces activated carbon and high-grade carbon black has been suggested.

=== Cement manufacturing ===
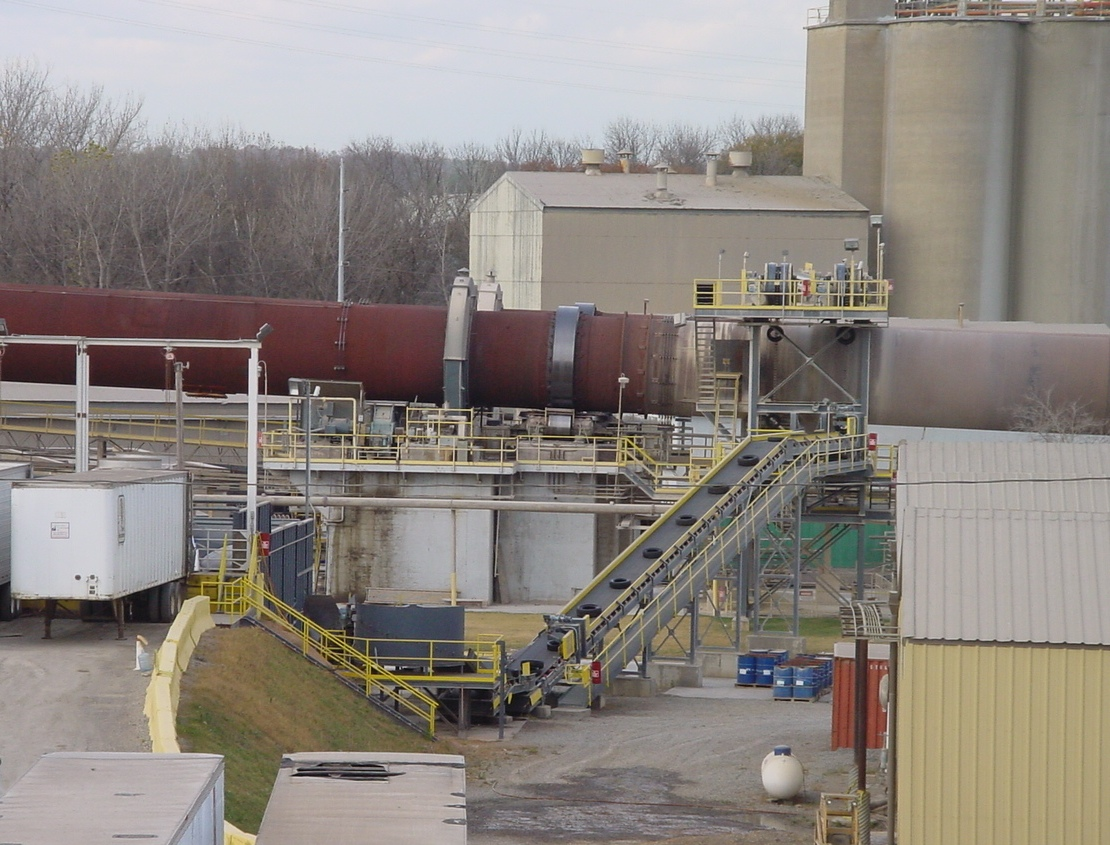
Used tires being fed mid-kiln to a pair of long cement kilns

Old tires can be used as an alternative fuel in the manufacturing of Portland cement, a key ingredient in concrete. Whole tires are commonly introduced into cement kilns, by rolling them into the upper end of a preheater kiln, or by dropping them through a slot midway along a long wet kiln. In either case, the high gas temperatures (1000–1200 °C) cause almost instantaneous, complete and smokeless combustion of the tire. Alternatively, tires are chopped into 5–10 mm chips, in which form they can be injected into a precalciner combustion chamber. Some iron input is required in manufacturing cement, so the iron content of steel-belted tires is beneficial to the process.

=== Tire-derived products ===
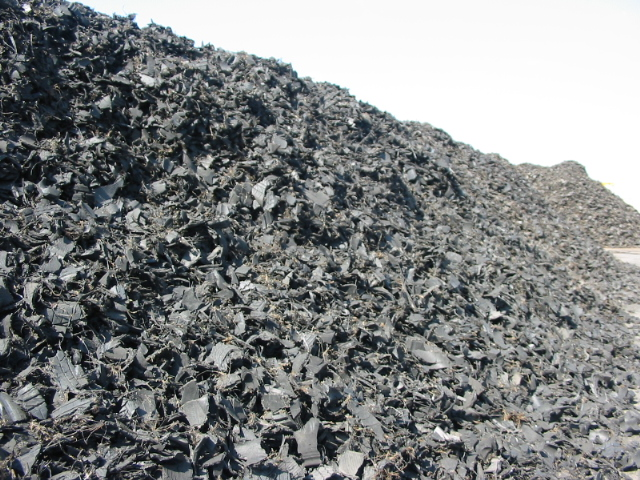
Shredded tires

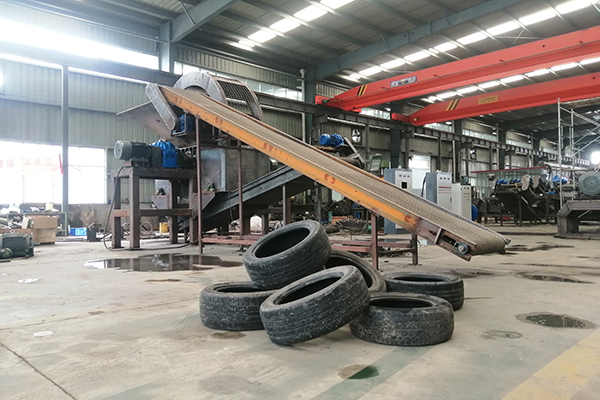
Tires can be shredded into small blocks for fuel with a tire shredder.

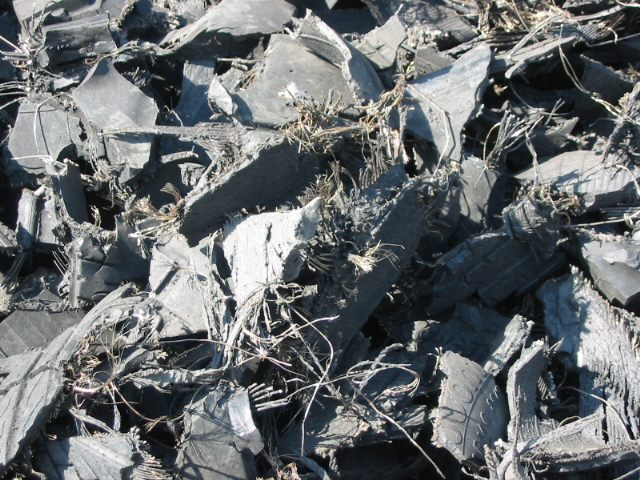
Closeup of shredded tires

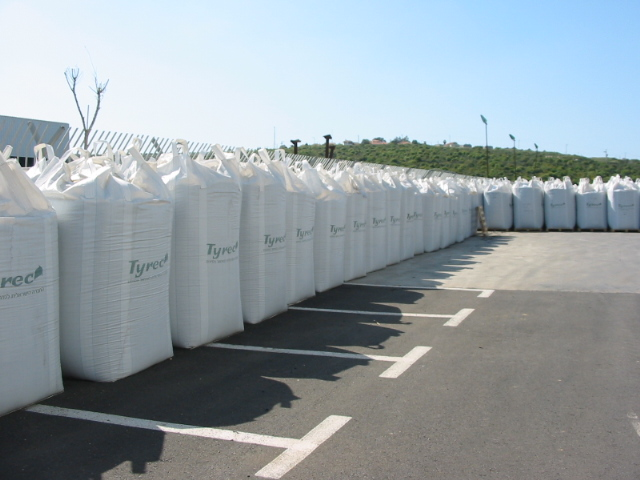
1 ton bags of crumb rubber

Tires can be reused in many ways, although most used tires are burnt for their fuel value. In a 2003 report cited by the U.S. EPA, it is stated that markets ("both recycling and beneficial use") existed for 80.4% of scrap tires, about 233 million tires per year. Assuming 22.5 pounds (10.2 kg) per tire, the 2003 report predicts a total weight of about 2.62 million tonnes (2,580,000 long tons; 2,890,000 short tons) from tires.

New products derived from waste tires generate more economic activity than combustion or other low multiplier production, while reducing waste stream without generating excessive pollution and emissions from recycling operations.

- Construction materials. Entire homes can be built with whole tires by filling them with earth and covering them with concrete, a common material in earthships. They are used in civil engineering applications such as sub-grade fill and embankments, back-fill for walls and bridge abutments, sub-grade insulation for roads, landfill projects, and septic system drain fields. Tires are also bound together and used as different types of barriers such as: collision reduction, erosion control, rainwater runoff, blasting mats, wave action that protects piers and marshes, and sound barriers between roadways and residences.
- Artificial reefs are built using tires that are bonded together in groups. There is some controversy on how effective tires are as an artificial reef system; an example is The Osborne Reef Project which has become an environmental nightmare that will cost millions of dollars to rectify.
- The process of stamping and cutting tires is used in some apparel products, such as sandals and as a road sub-base, by connecting together the cut sidewalls to form a flexible net.
- The markets predicted by the 2003 report were: tire-derived fuel (TDF) using 130 million tires, civil engineering projects using 56 million tires, ground rubber turned into molded rubber products using 18 million tires, ground rubber turned into rubber-modified asphalt using 12 million tires, Exported items using 9 million tires, cut, stamped and punched products using 6.5 million tires, and agricultural and miscellaneous uses 3 million tires.
- Shredded tires, known as tire-derived aggregate (TDA), have many civil engineering applications. TDA can be used as a back-fill for retaining walls, fill for landfill gas trench collection wells, back-fill for roadway landslide repair projects as well as a vibration damping material for railway lines.
- Ground and crumb rubber, also known as size-reduced rubber, can be used in both paving type projects and in mold-able products. These types of paving are: Rubber Modified Asphalt (RMA), Rubber Modified Concrete, and as a substitution for an aggregate. Examples of rubber-molded products are carpet padding or underlay, flooring materials, dock bumpers, patio decks, railroad crossing blocks, livestock mats, sidewalks, rubber tiles and bricks, movable speed bumps, and curbing/edging. The rubber can be molded with plastic for products like pallets and railroad ties. Athletic and recreational areas can also be paved with the shock absorbing rubber-molded material. Rubber from tires is sometimes ground into medium-sized chunks and used as rubber mulch. Rubber crumb can also be used as an infill, alone or blended with coarse sand, as in infill for grass-like synthetic turf products such as Field-turf.
- Steel mills can use tires as a carbon source, replacing coal or coke in steel manufacturing.
- Tires are also often recycled for use on basketball courts and new shoe products.

=== Tire pyrolysis ===
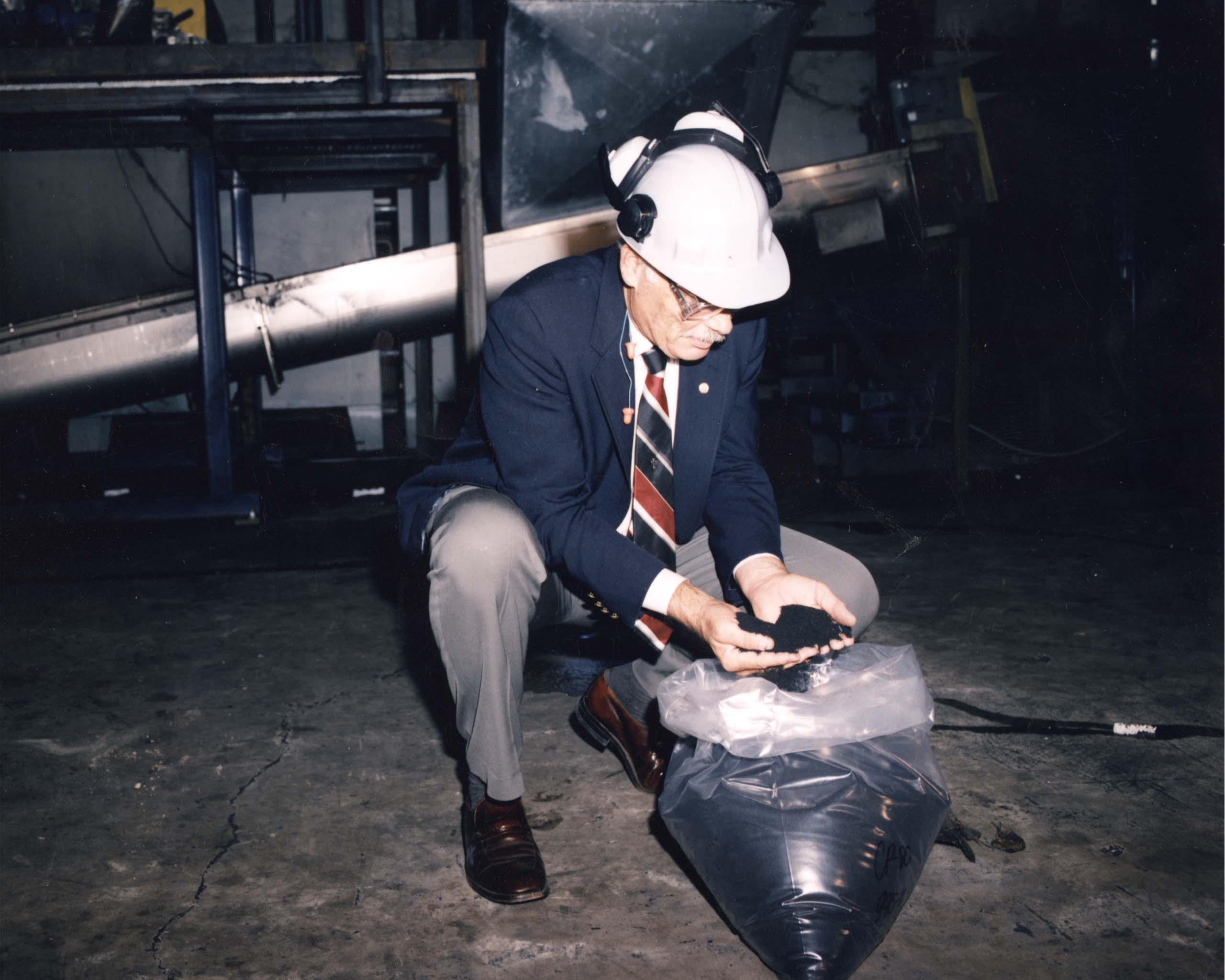
NASA Stennis Space Center worked on cryogenic recycling of tires, in 1995.

The pyrolysis method for recycling used tires is a technique which heats whole or shredded tires in a reactor vessel containing an oxygen-free atmosphere. In the reactor, the rubber is softened after which the rubber polymers break down into smaller molecules. These smaller molecules eventually vaporize and exit from the reactor. These vapors can be burned directly to produce power or condensed into an oily type liquid, generally used as a fuel. Some molecules are too small to condense. They remain as a gas which can be burned as fuel. The minerals that were part of the tire, about 40% by weight, are removed as solid ashes. When performed properly, the tire pyrolysis process is a clean operation and produces little emissions or waste; however, concerns about air pollution due to incomplete combustion as is the case with tire fires has been documented.

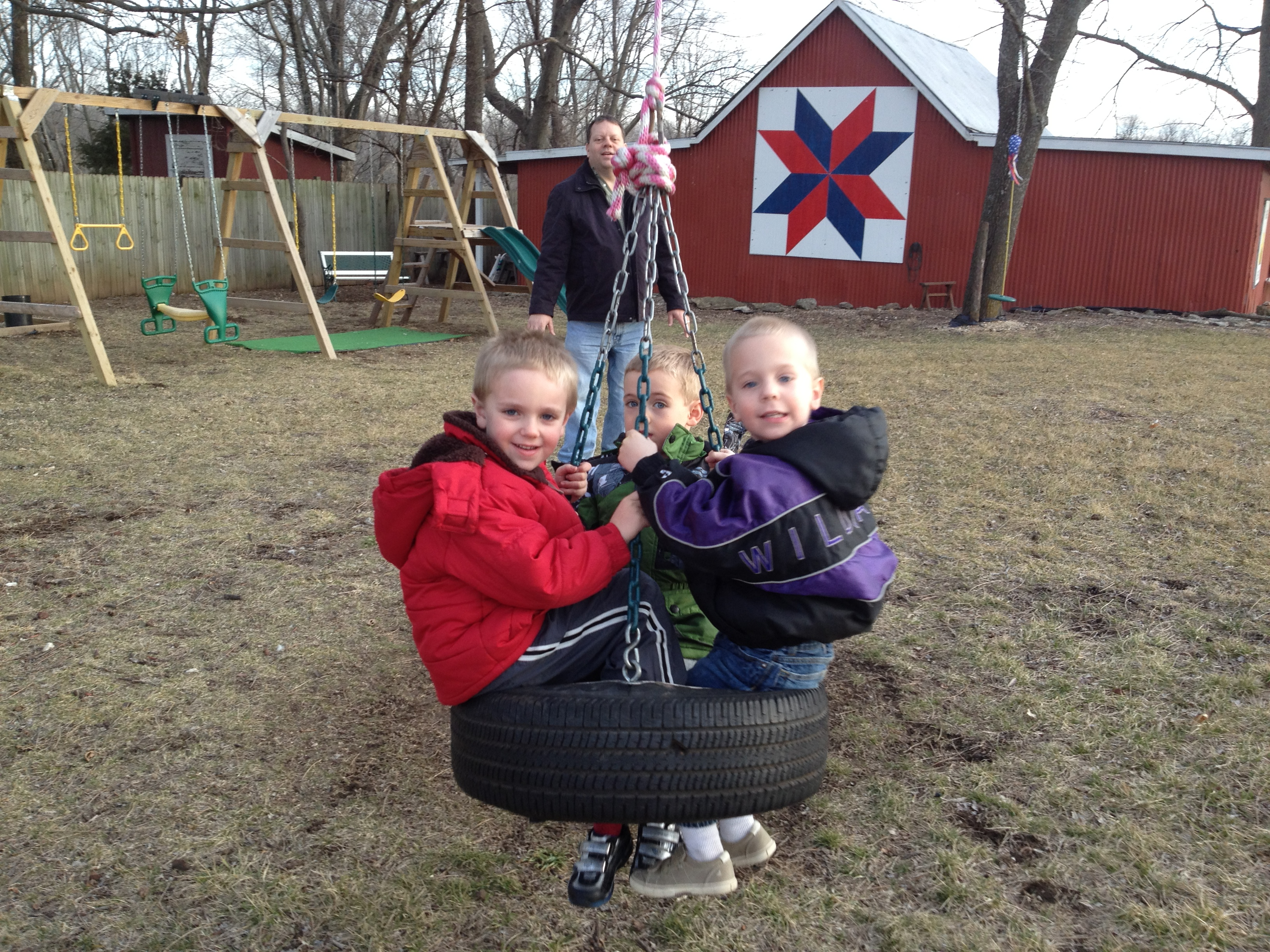
Three boys are on a tire swing

The properties of the gas, liquid, and solid output are determined by the type of feed-stock used and the process conditions. For instance whole tires contain fibers and steel. Shredded tires have most of the steel and sometimes most of the fiber removed. Processes can be either batch or continuous. The energy required to drive the decomposition of the rubber include using directly fired fuel (like a gas oven), electrical induction (like an electrically heated oven) or by microwaves (like a microwave oven). Sometimes a catalyst is used to accelerate the decomposition. The choice of feed-stock and process can affect the value of the finished products.

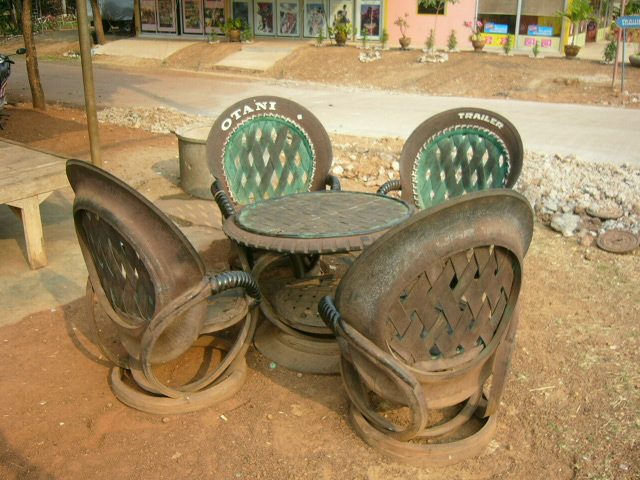
Car tires as seats in Thailand

The historical issue of tire pyrolysis has been the solid mineral stream, which accounts for about 40% of the output. The steel can be removed from the solid stream with magnets for recycling. The remaining solid material, often referred to as "char", has had little or no value other than possibly as a low grade carbon fuel. Char is the destroyed remains of the original carbon black used to reinforce and provide abrasion resistance to the tire. The solid stream also includes the minerals used in rubber manufacturing. This high volume component of tire pyrolysis is a major impediment, although this theme continues to be a source of innovation.

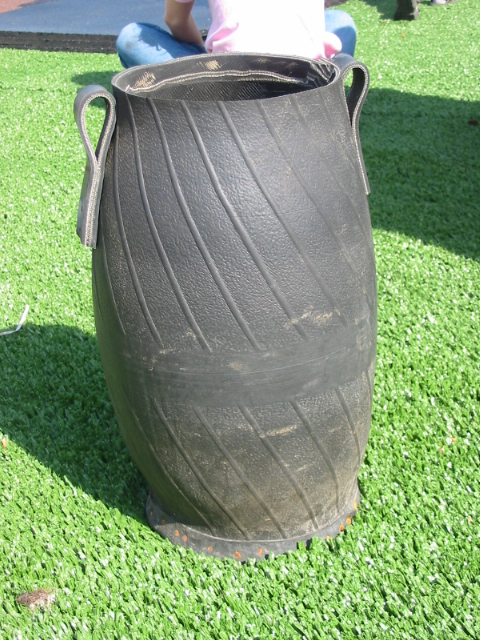
Tire art

=== Cryogenic recycling ===
Tires can be frozen using cryogens, or super-cold fluids, then broken down and made into crumb rubber which can be used in asphalt road beds, agricultural hoses, and truck bed liners.

=== Repurposing ===
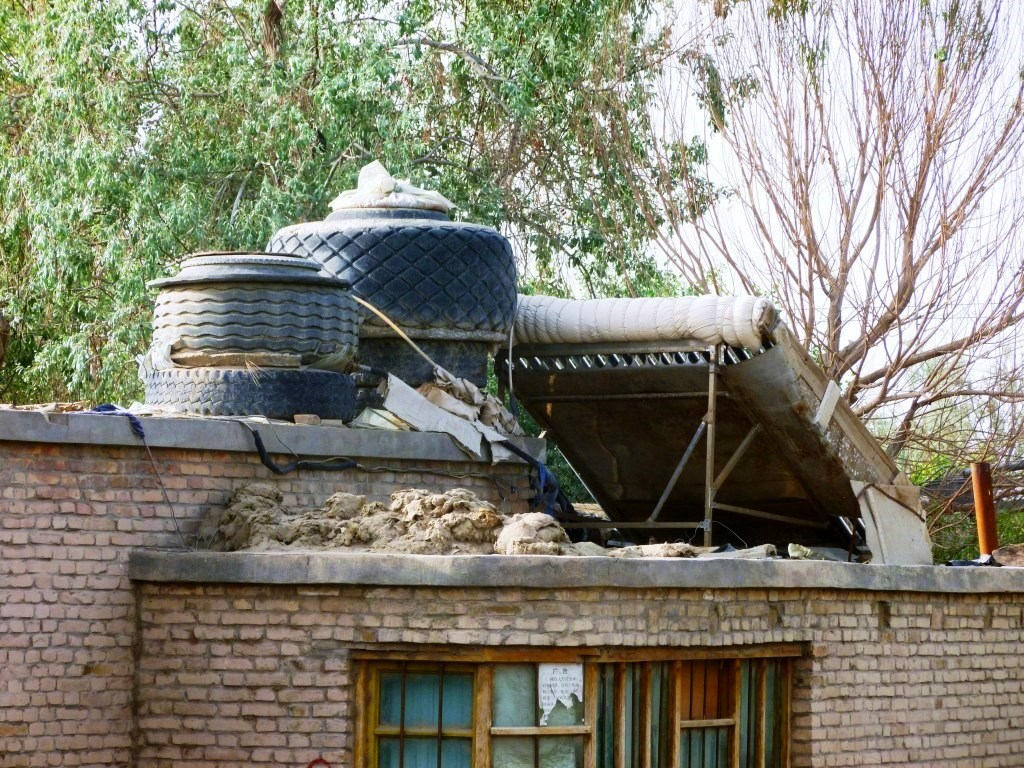
Tires recycled into water tanks on roof. Cherchen, Xinjiang.

Aside from recycling old tires, the old tire can be put to a new use.

Old tires are sometimes converted into a swing for play. The innovative use allows for an easy way to find a purpose for an existing old tire not suitable for road use.

Used tires are also employed as exercise equipment for athletic programs such as American football. One classic conditioning drill that hones players' speed and agility is the "Tire Run" where tires are laid out side by side, with each tire on the left a few inches ahead of the tire on the right in a zigzag pattern. Athletes then run through the tire pattern by stepping in the center of each tire. The drill forces athletes to lift their feet above the ground higher than normal to avoid tripping. Other athletic uses include tire flipping (tractor or large truck tires typically used) or for upper cardio conditioning by hitting a tire repetitively with a sledge hammer.

Re-purposed tires can also be harnessed as an affordable alternative building material used in the framework of rammed Earth thermal mass dwellings. This is beneficial across scales of production such as individually sustainable housing.

Rows of stacks of tires are often used as barriers in motor racing circuits as a method of dissipating kinetic energy over a longer period of time during a crash, comparatively to striking a less malleable material such as a concrete or steel wall.

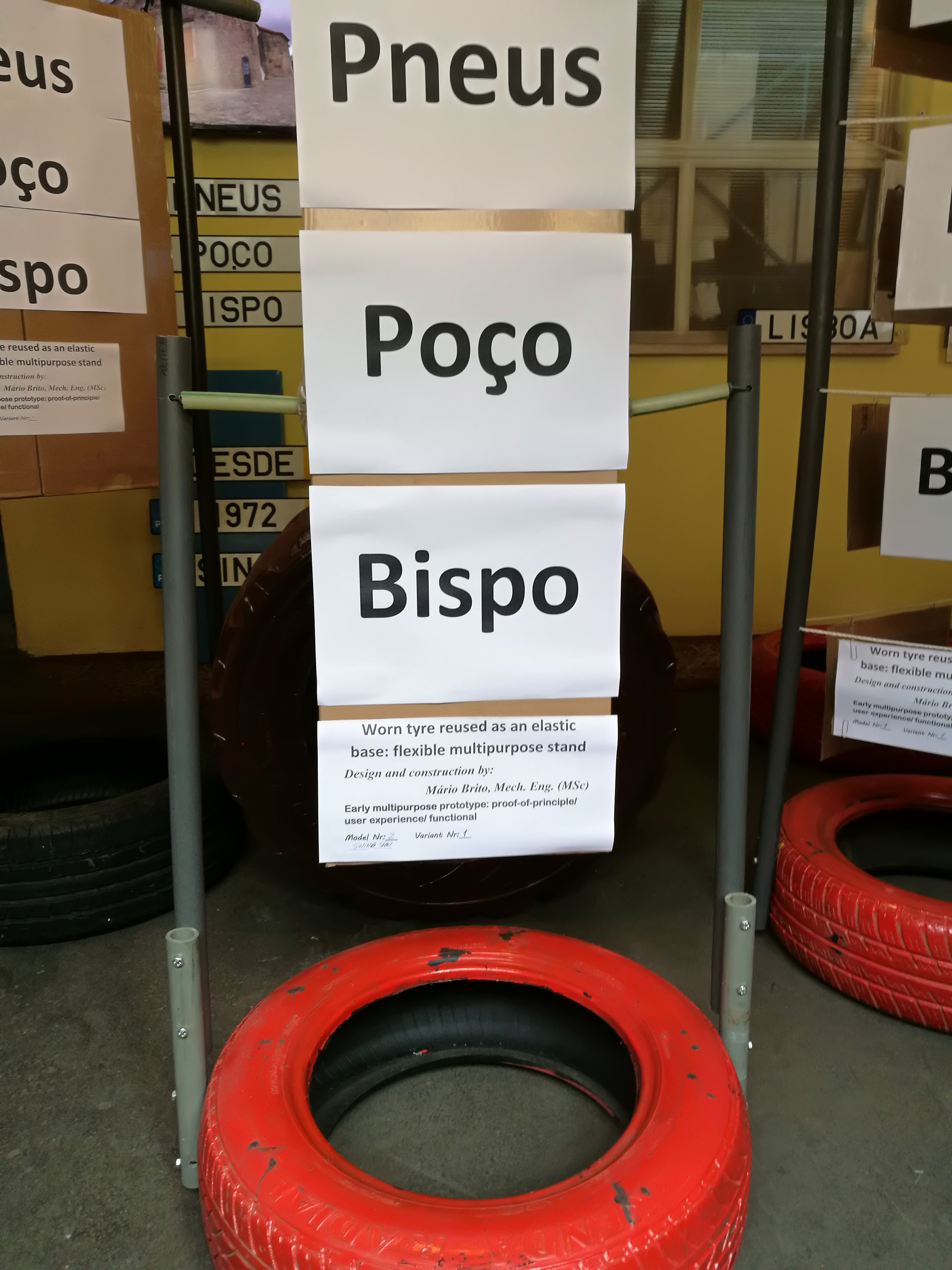
Tire repurposed as an elastic base uses. Prototype Nr.2, Variant Nr.1: Mid-body axle swing sign. Lisbon, Portugal.

Many cattle farmers re-purpose old tractor tires as water troughs for their cattle by placing them over natural springs or by piping stream water into them. These tires contain the water and allow it to pool for the cattle without any additional interaction from the farmer. Most farmers also include a drainage pipe near the top or in the center of the tire so excess water can drain off to prevent overflow and erosion around the outside of the tire where the cattle would be.

Repurposing as an elastic base for multipurpurposes uses, such as holding advertisement boards, static or swinging. This is an application still under development and at a prototype stage.

==== Rubber shingle roofs ====
Rubber shingle roofs are typically made from 95% recycled material from a variety of sources including recycled tires. They last twice as long as asphalt shingles but are about twice the price as asphalt. They are more quiet than most roofs, hail resistant, and a high wind rating if there is a tongue and groove fitting at the front edge of the rubber shingle design.

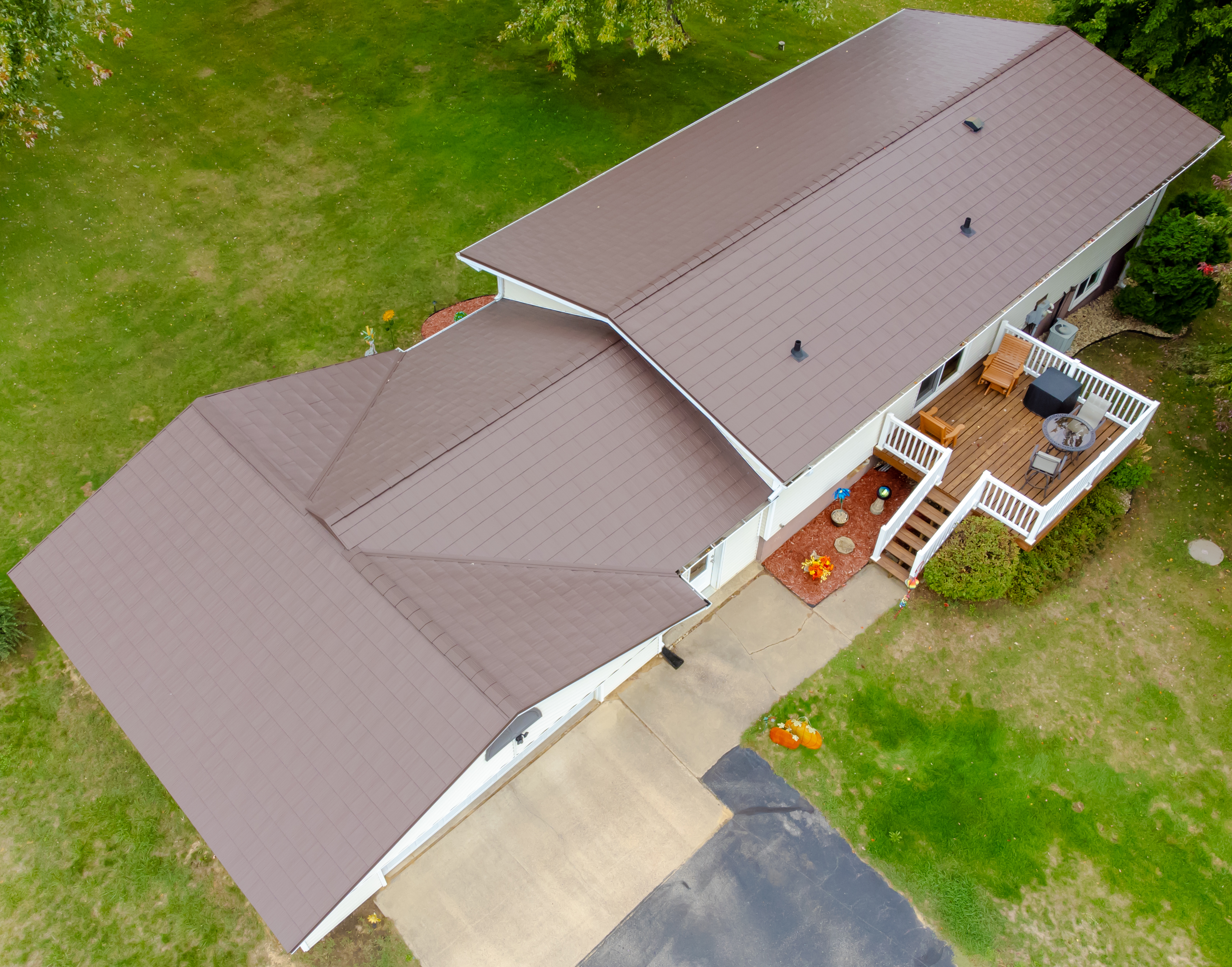
Rubber shingle roof

== Environmental concerns ==
Due to their heavy metal and other pollutant content, tires pose a risk for the leaching of toxins into the groundwater when placed in wet soils. Research has shown that very little leaching occurs when shredded tires are used as light fill material; however, limitations have been put on use of this material; each site should be individually assessed determining if this product is appropriate for given conditions.

For both above and below water table applications, the preponderance of evidence shows that TDA (tire-derived aggregate, or shredded tires) will not cause primary drinking water standards to be exceeded for metals. Moreover, TDA is unlikely to increase levels of metals with primary drinking water standards above naturally occurring background levels.

== See also ==
- Artificial turf
- Plastic recycling
- Rubber mulch
- Rubberized asphalt
- Technoflex
- Tire fire
- Vulcanization
- Waste management
