= Rubberized asphalt =

Pavement material

Rubberized asphalt concrete (RAC), also known as asphalt rubber or just rubberized asphalt, is noise reducing pavement material that consists of regular asphalt concrete mixed with crumb rubber made from recycled tires. Asphalt rubber is the largest single market for ground rubber in the United States, consuming an estimated 220,000,000 pounds (100,000,000 kg), or approximately 12 million tires annually.

Use of rubberized asphalt as a pavement material was pioneered by the city of Phoenix, Arizona in the 1960s because of its high durability. Since then it has garnered interest for its ability to reduce road noise.

In 2003 the Arizona Department of Transportation began a three-year, $34-million Quiet Pavement Pilot Program, in cooperation with the Federal Highway Administration to determine if sound walls can be replaced by rubberized asphalt to reduce noise alongside highways. After about one year it was determined that asphalt rubber overlays resulted in up to 12 decibels of in road noise reduction, with a typical reduction of 7 to 9 decibels.

Arizona has been the leader in using rubberized asphalt, but California, Florida, Texas, and South Carolina are also using asphalt rubber. Tests are currently underway in other parts of the United States to determine the durability of rubberized asphalt in northern climates, including a 1.3 mile stretch of Interstate 405 in Bellevue and Kirkland, Washington and a handful of local roads in the city of Colorado Springs, Colorado. In 2012, the State of Georgia issued a specification for the use of rubber-modified asphalt as a replacement for polymer-modified asphalt. In Belgium, tests in the ring of Brussel and in the F1 circuit of Francorchamp (see the film by Jean-Marie Piquint Rubberized Asphalt for Esso Belgium).

Two quality control requirements are necessary when using asphalt rubber: (a) crumb rubber tends to separate and settle down in the asphalt cement and therefore asphalt rubber needs to be agitated continuously to keep the rubber particles in suspension and (b) crumb rubber is prone to degradation (devulcanization and depolymerization) and thus lose its elasticity if asphalt rubber is maintained at high temperatures for more than 6–8 hours. This means asphalt rubber must be used within 8 hours after production.

== Porous Elastic Road Surfaces ==
Porous Elastic Road Surfaces (PERS) or poroelastic road surfaces improve RAC by incorporating voids and channels, making the pavement porous and further reducing traffic noise.
