= U.S. Tire Manufacturers Association =

U.S. trade and advocacy group

- United States Tire Manufacturers Association
- Abbreviation: USTMA
- Predecessor: Rubber Manufacturers Association, Rubber Club of America
- Formation: 1915; 111 years ago
- Type: Trade association
- Location: Washington, DC, United States
- Region served: United States
- Services: Public policy advocacy
- Members: 12 Companies (2025)
- President: Anne Forristall Luke
- Funding: Members fees
- Website: ustires.org

The U.S. Tire Manufacturers Association (USTMA), formerly Rubber Manufacturers Association, is an American trade association and advocacy group for United States rubber tire manufacturers.

The association was established in 1915 as the Rubber Club of America. It was later renamed to the Rubber Manufacturers Association. In may 1969, the Rubber Manufacturers Association formed the Tire Industry Safety Council trade association in the United States which is based in Washington, D.C.

The association describes its role as:

RMA represents its members before federal, state and local government entities; develops safety standards for passenger, light truck and commercial truck tires; advocates for environmentally and economically sound scrap tire management policies aggregates data pertaining to U.S. tire shipments; and, educates consumers about proper tire care, among other activities.

— U.S. Tire Manufacturers Association

== History ==
The association was originally established in 1915 as the Rubber Club of America. It initially represented a broad range of rubber product manufacturers before evolving to focus primarily on tire manufacturers with operations in the U.S.

In 2015, government relations expert Anne Forristall Luke was nominated President and CEO of the RMA.

In 2017 RMA rebranded itself as U.S. Tire Manufacturers Association.

== Members ==
Members of the association are:

- Bridgestone
- Continental
- Giti Tire
- Goodyear
- Hankook
- Kumho
- Michelin
- Nokian Tyres
- Pirelli
- Toyo
- Yokohama

== See also ==
- The British Rubber Manufacturers' Association - a British trade association that represents the rubber manufacturing industry in the United Kingdom.
- European Tyre & Rubber Manufacturers' association (ETRMA) - a European trade associataion that represents tyre manufacturers in the European Union
