= Rubber mulch =

Mulch made from recycled rubber

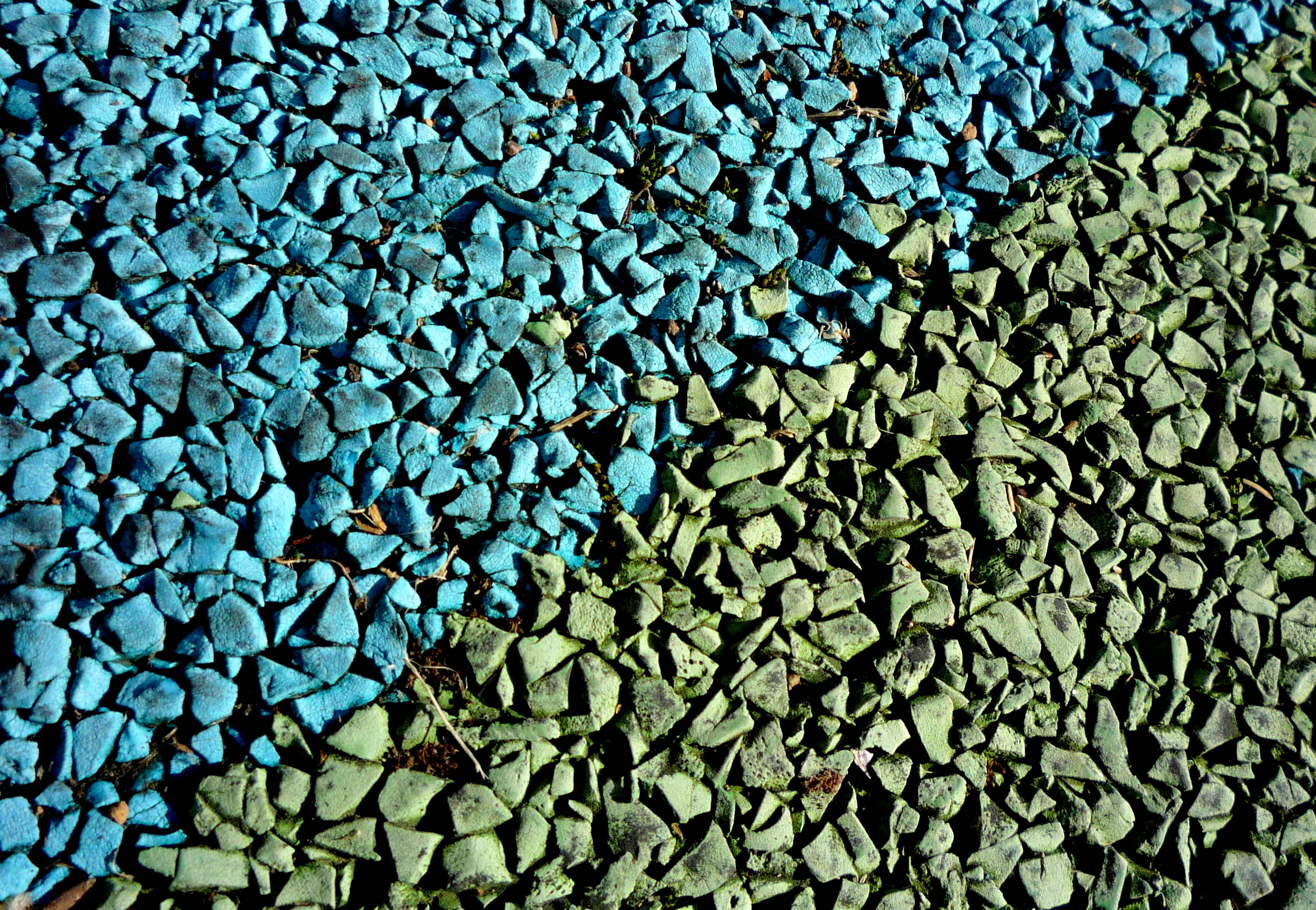
Blue and green colored rubber mulch

Rubber mulch is a type of mulch used in gardening and landscaping that is made from recycled rubber, most often crumb rubber sourced from waste tires.

== Composition ==
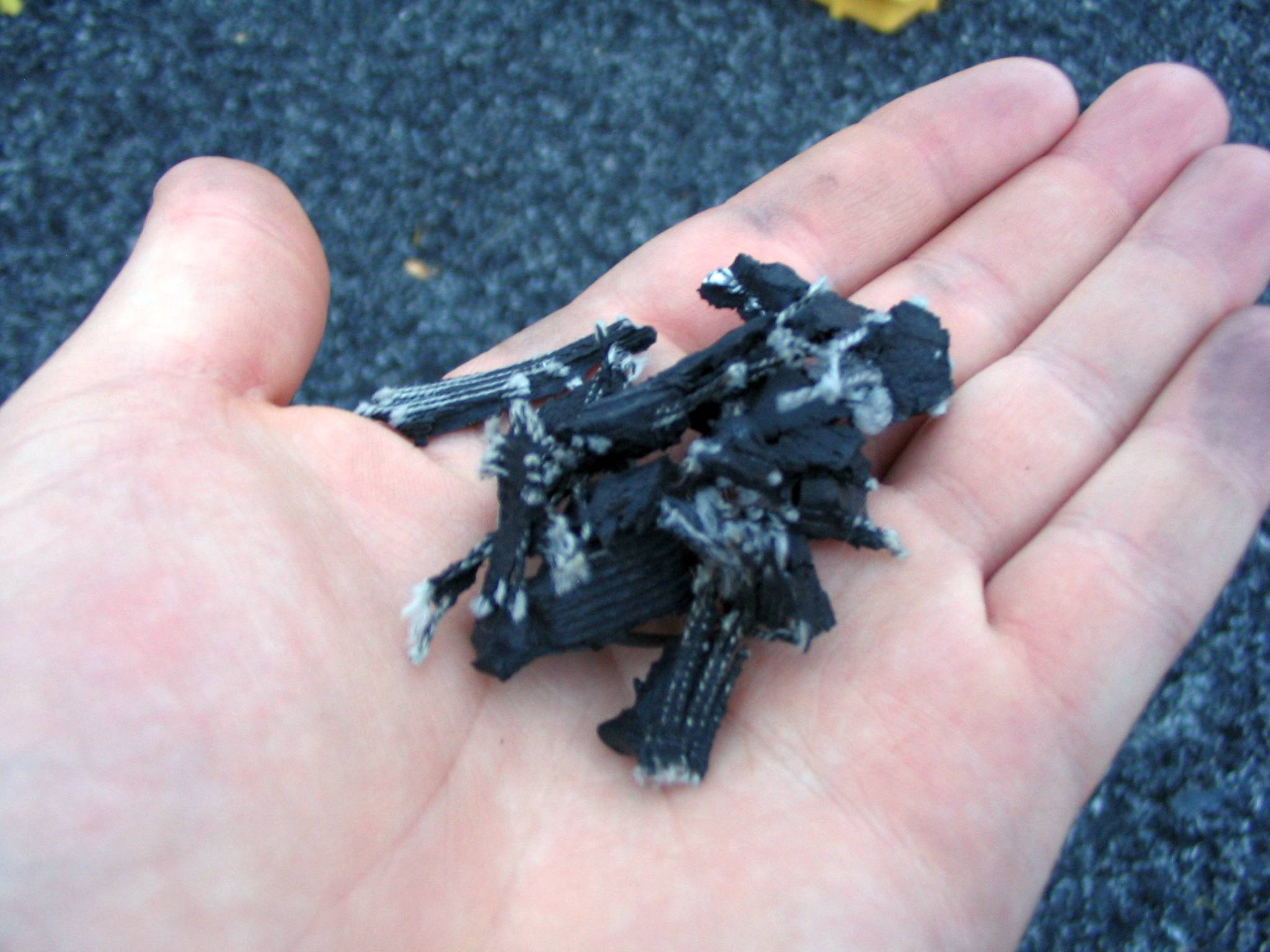
Rubber mulch nuggets; the white fibers are nylon cords, which are present in the tires which the mulch is made from

Rubber mulch typically consists of waste tire bits or nuggets of synthetic rubber obtained from tires that have been shredded or ground up whole, with their steel bands removed. This process can involve the use of various types of tires, including those from passenger vehicles, large trucks, and trailers. The resulting rubber mulch bits or nuggets range in size from 10 mm to 32 mm, or 3/8 inch to 11/4 inch

== Advantages ==
For landscaping and gardening purposes, both nuggets and buffings of rubber mulch provide insulation for the soil, which can result in a soil temperature difference of 2 or 3 degrees F higher compared to wood mulches. Additionally, rubber mulch is advantageous for soil moisture, as rubber is non-porous and does not absorb water as it passes through to the soil. Moreover, it can reduce fungus growth and plant growth while acting as a weed barrier, as weed seeds dehydrate in the mulch before reaching the soil.

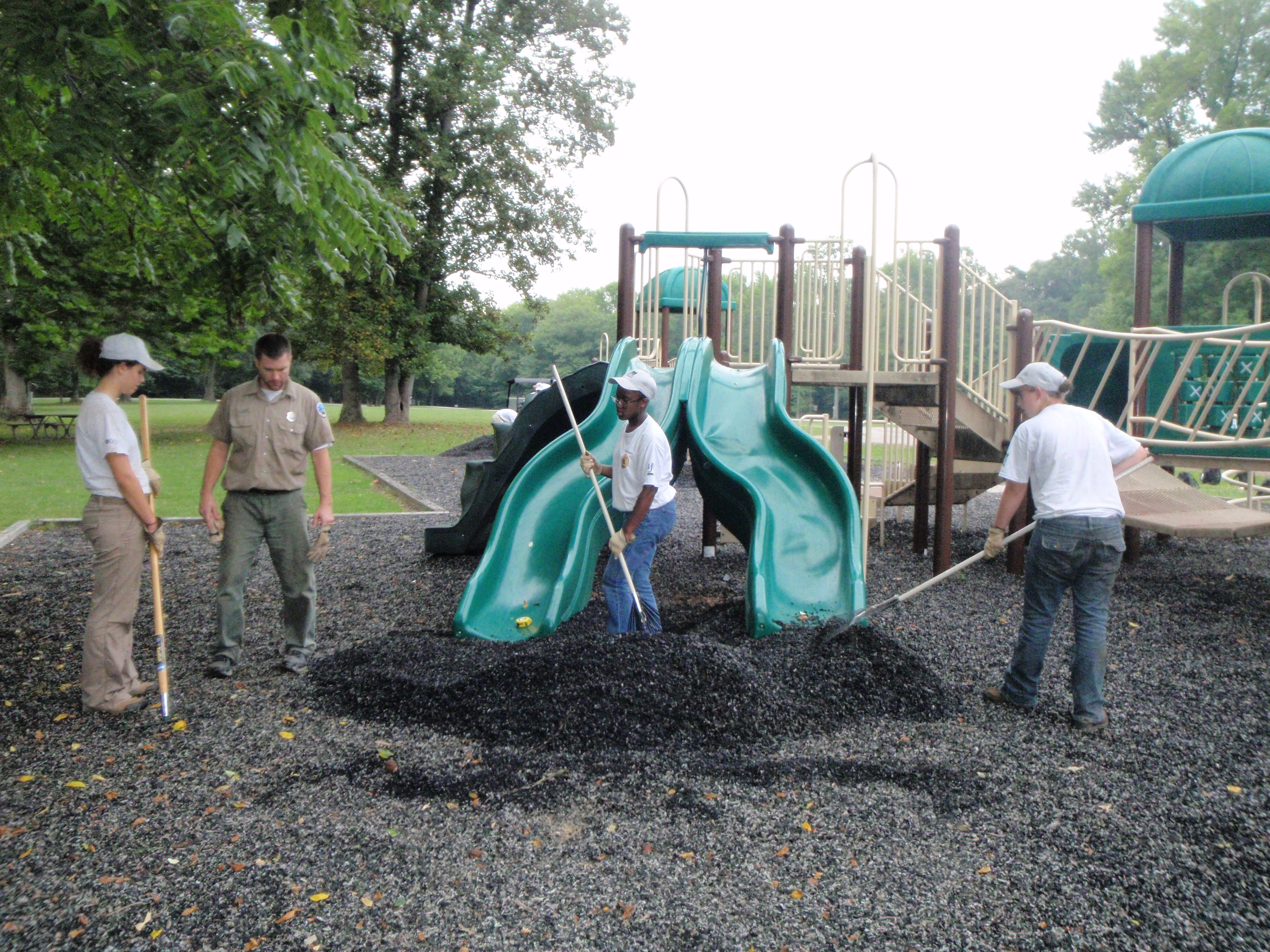
Rubber mulch being installed at a playground

Another advantage over plant-material mulches is its elasticity, which gives it a springy quality when used in a fairly thick layer. This makes it a choice for playgrounds, where the springiness provides additional safety for children when they fall off of playground equipment. Tests have shown that rubber mulch is superior in breaking falls to traditional bark mulches. The International Play Equipment Manufacturers Association has certified some rubber mulches for ASTM F1292-09.

== Disadvantages ==
Unlike organic mulch, rubber mulch does not enrich soil or increase soil biodiversity through decomposition. Neither nuggets nor buffings provide any humus to compacted soil types. At worst, it leads to soil contamination (see Environmental Impact and Safety Testing) Some recycled varieties may leach chemicals (some toxic) which are harmful to plants Rubber mulch is a particular hazard if ignited because of the resulting fumes that resemble those produced in tire fires. Rubber mulch is also more likely to ignite and harder to extinguish than other mulches. Compared to organic mulches, rubber mulch can become extremely hot when in direct sunlight. There is also concern about the potential for entire rubber mulch nuggets being washed off into waterways or leached chemicals being washed out into the groundwater, causing water pollution in both cases.

== Environmental impact and safety testing ==
In the US, the Environmental Protection Agency (EPA) has launched a multi-agency Federal Research Action Plan on Recycled Tire Crumb Used on Playing Fields and Playgrounds to study key environmental human health questions concerning the safety of recycled tire crumb. The EPA previously studied air and surface samples at four fields and playgrounds that use recycled tires. The limited study, conducted in August through October 2008, found that the concentrations of materials that made up tire crumb were below levels considered harmful. In addition, the overall study protocol and many of the methods were found to be appropriate and could be implemented in the field. The study, however, did note that due to its limited nature and the large diversity of materials used to make tire crumb, no definitive conclusions could be reached. More recently, the EPA has released a comprehensive spreadsheet with toxicity reference information.

The California Office of Environmental Health Hazard Assessment (OEHHA) used guinea pigs, in an animal study, to test skin sensitization by playground surfaces made of recycled tires and observed no sensitization. This suggested that these surfaces would not cause skin sensitization in children, nor would they be expected to elicit skin reaction in children already sensitized to latex. The OEHHA has conducted additional studies on potential negative human health effects associated with the use of recycled waste tires in playground and synthetic turf products.

Although rubber mulch is generally regarded as safe, recycled tire rubber leachates do contain certain minerals and compounds which may be ecotoxic in high concentrations. Recycled tire mulch can contain trace amounts of various minerals from the tire manufacturing process and other chemicals that may have been picked up during the tire's service life. The greater the surface area of synthetic rubber waste pellets, the greater the potential for breakdown into harmful constituents. For leached tire debris, the (potential) environmental impact of the ingredients zinc and organic toxicants has been demonstrated.

== See also ==
- Rubber – Polymer harvested from certain trees
- Tire recycling – Reuse of waste tires
- Green building – Environmentally responsible construction principles
- Plastic mulch – Plastic film used in the role of mulch
- Sustainable landscaping – Low maintenance landscaping
