= Crumb rubber =

Recycled rubber produced from scrap tires

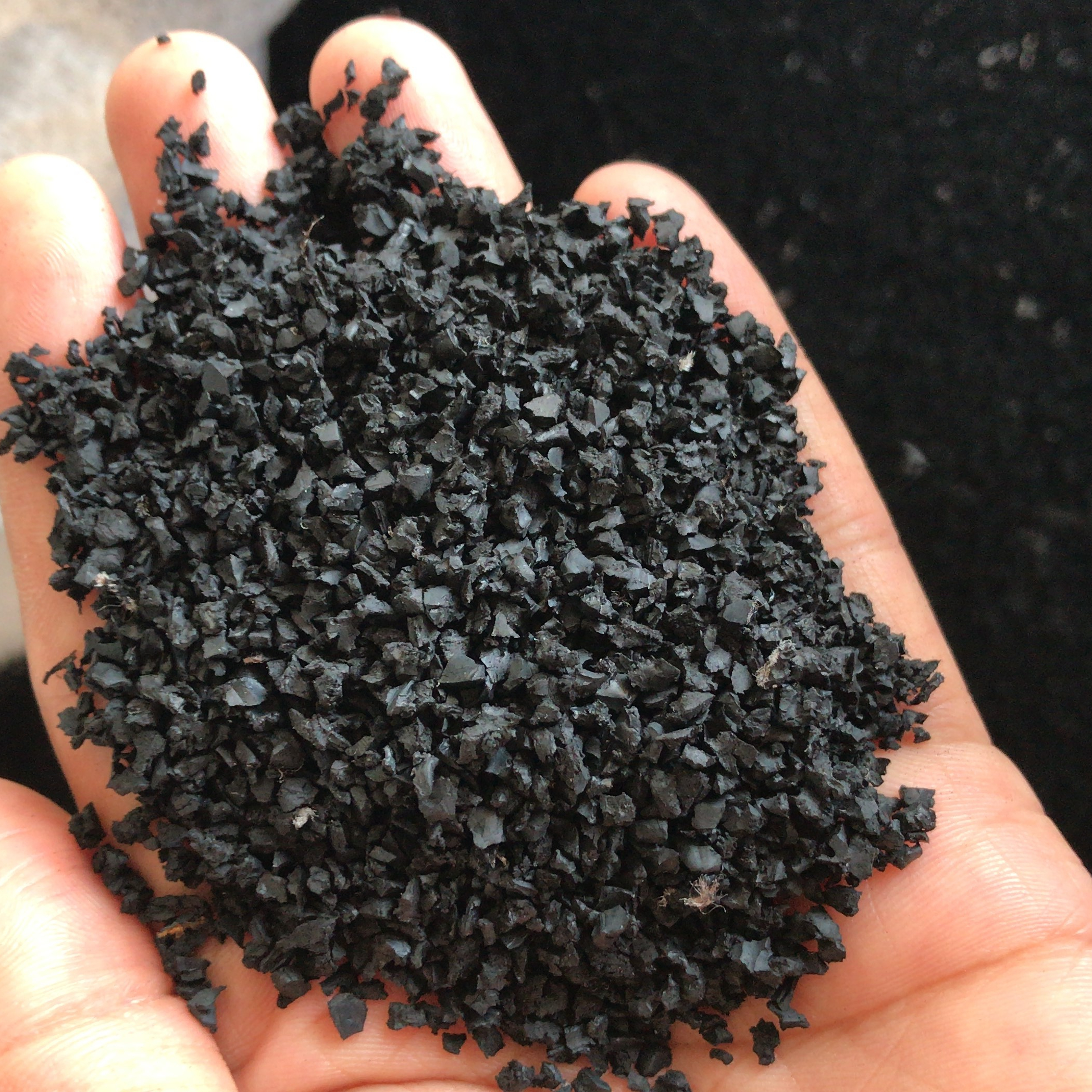
Handful of crumb rubber

Crumb rubber is recycled rubber produced from automotive and truck scrap tires. During the recycling process, steel and tire cord (fluff) are removed, leaving tire rubber with a granular consistency. Continued processing with a granulator or cracker mill, possibly with the aid of cryogenics or by mechanical means, reduces the size of the particles further. The particles are sized and classified based on various criteria including color (black only or black and white). The granulate is sized by passing through a screen, the size based on a dimension (1/4 inch) or mesh (holes per inch : 10, 20, etc.). Crumb rubber is often used in artificial turf as cushioning.

== Background ==
The first synthetic grass was placed over concrete in 1964 and became known as "Chem Grass". It was later named "AstroTurf" when it was installed in the Houston Astrodome in 1966. Athletes did not like playing on these fields because of the risk of injury due to the hard surface. A new artificial turf system was developed in the early 2000s based on "crumb rubber." The black crumbs are small pieces of styrene-butadiene rubber made from grinding up old vehicle tires. The tire crumbs are poured in between the artificial grass blades, giving the artificial fields more cushion and support. This reduced major injuries compared to AstroTurf.

== Recycled pavement material ==
Rubberized asphalt is the largest market for crumb rubber in the United States, consuming an estimated 220 million pounds (100 kt), or approximately 12 million tires annually. Crumb rubber is also used as ground cover under playground equipment, and as a surface material for running tracks and athletic fields.

== Grading ==
The following are common classifications of crumb rubber:

Retreaders tire buffings shall consist of clean, fresh, dry buffings from tire retread preparation operations.

No.1 - Tire Granule shall consist of granulated tire crumb, Black Only Guaranteed MetalFree, sized. Magnetically separated materials are not acceptable. Fluff from tire cord removed.

No.2 - Tire Granule shall consist of granulated tire crumb, Black & White Guaranteed MetalFree, sized to minus 40 Mesh. Magnetically separated materials are not acceptable. Fluff from tire cord removed.

No.3 - Tire Granule shall consist of granulated tire crumb, Black Only Magnetically Separated, sized. Fluff from tire cord removed.

No.4 - Tire Granule shall consist of granulated tire crumb, Black & White Magnetically Separated, sized. Fluff from tire cord removed.

No.5 - Tire Granule shall consist of unclassified granulated tire crumb, Sized, Unseparated, not magnetically separated, fluff from tire cord not removed.

== Purposes ==
- Athletic surfaces and fields (rubber mulch)
- Agrimats and equestrian footing
- Automotive parts and tires
- Construction/indoor
- Landscape, trails and walkways
- Molded and extruded products
- Playground and other safety surfaces
- Rubber modified asphalt and sealants
- Rubber and plastic blends
- Vibration dampening
- Concrete manufacturing

== Benefits ==
When dealing with asphalt overlays, reflection cracks can arise and cause an unwanted crack pattern beneath the pavement. Rubber-modified asphalt uses stress absorbing membranes that reduce the reflective cracking because of its elastic properties. With fewer cracks, there are fewer repairs, so crumb rubber assists in reducing maintenance costs. The pavement has an increased lifespan because after multiple uses and exposure to different elements, regular asphalt loses elasticity over time. The use of the artificial rubber resists the formation of cracks and has an anti-aging effect that keeps the asphalt in a better condition.

== Concerns ==
=== Scientific research ===
Crumb rubber infill has been a widely studied topic. To date, there are nearly 100 studies and reports, from government bodies and independent researchers, that have assessed the potential for health risks based on various pathways of exposure. Connecticut’s Department of Public Health conducted an extensive study and published three peer-reviewed studies on the safety of crumb rubber and determined that there is “no scientific support for a finding of elevated cancer risk from inhalation or ingestion of chemicals derived from recycled tires used on artificial turf fields.” In 2015, the Massachusetts Department of Public Health also studied crumb rubber and came to a similar conclusion.

The US Environmental Protection Agency (EPA) was about to conclude a peer led study of all US studies in mid to late 2018, using peer and public evidence to fill in the information gaps between the avenues of study and real life anecdotal concerns, experiences with medical scientific perspectives included. In the EU, the European Chemicals Agency (ECHA) had also produced a report titled ANNEX XV which specifically looked at rubber crumb chemical make up and at concerns. It too overall concluded that the risks were extremely low compared to the benefits of health and exercise. However, as recently as 2017 and again in 2018, further chemicals have begun to be scrutinized further which were previously unregistered in that incarnation of the ANNEX report on rubber crumb. Substances of Very High Concern (SVHCs) are carcinogenic chemicals, endocrine disruptive chemicals, and chemicals dangerous to aquatic life that are being identified as in need of restriction in the ECHA REACH2018 program. Chemicals such as chrysene, benzo(a)pyrene, benzo(e)pyrene, benzene and others are now on the restricted chemicals Candidate List, ready to be included in the next incarnation of the ANNEX XIV report.

=== Athletics ===
Artificial turf fields are found all over the United States and are most commonly found at major high schools and athletic facilities. Crumb rubber is used as the infill in artificial turf systems to make the surface safe. The Synthetic Turf Council says there are about 13,000 fields using crumb rubber, with about 1,500 new installations annually.

In 2014, Amy Griffin, soccer coach at the University of Washington, surveyed American players of the sport who had developed cancer. Of 38 players, 34 were goalkeepers, a position in which diving to the surface makes accidental ingestion or blood contact with crumb rubber more likely, Griffin has asserted. Lymphoma and leukemia, cancers of the blood, predominated.

The Connecticut Department of Public Health concluded "Based upon these findings, the use of outdoor and indoor artificial turf fields is not associated with elevated health risks. However, it would be prudent for building operators to provide adequate ventilation to prevent a buildup of rubber-related volatile organic compounds (VOCs) and semi-volatile organic compounds (SVOCs) at indoor fields. The current study did not evaluate new fields under hot weather conditions and so the potential for acute risks under this circumstance is another uncertainty. The current results are generally consistent with the findings from studies conducted by New York City, New York State, the USEPA and Norway which tested different kinds of fields and under a variety of weather conditions. Thus, it appears that the current results are reasonably representative of conditions that can be encountered at indoor and outdoor crumb rubber fields, although this tentative conclusion could benefit from the testing of additional fields.."

A study by Brian T. Pavilonis, et al. found “ that for the products and fields we tested, exposure to infill and artificial turf was generally considered de minimus [sic], with the possible exception of lead for some fields and materials.”

FIFA’s Chief Medical Officer Prof. Jiří Dvořák says that “The majority of the studies have been on higher surface area particles and have concluded they are currently acceptable. Therefore the larger granules used in artificial turf will have even less potential for emissions. For example a study undertaken by the Danish Ministry of the Environment concluded that the health risk on children’s playgrounds that contained both worn tires and granulate rubber was insignificant. The available body of research does not substantiate the assumption that cancer resulting from exposure to styrene-butadiene (SBR) granulate infills in artificial turf could potentially occur.”

Scientific Instrument Services, Volatile Organic Emissions from Automobile Tires, 1999, Santford V. Overton & John J. Manura : Tire "Brand A were found to contain numerous straight and branched chain hydrocarbons, aldehydes, alcohols, ketones, furans and benzene derivatives." Tire brand B was..."found to contain high concentrations of the compounds sulfur dioxide (DOT), 2-methyl-1-propene, 2-propanone, 2-methyl-2-pentene, 2,4-pentanedione, acetic acid and 2,4-(1H, 3H) pyrimidinedione." Chemicals extracted from raw tires in this study would be found in crumb rubber, which is made by grinding feedstock tires. The chemicals listed above include carcinogens, and other chemicals with dermal and endocrine disrupting impacts.

=== Current bans and restrictions ===
- In 2015, Montgomery County in Maryland placed a ban on publicly funded crumb rubber turf fields.
- In 2017, Washington, DC placed a moratorium on the installation of synthetic turf using crumb rubber.
- In 2018, Westport, Connecticut published an ordinance prohibiting the application of synthetic infill material on playing fields on town property.
- In September 2022, the European Commission published a draft proposal to restrict or prohibit the sale of “granular infill for use on synthetic sports surfaces” as part of a larger aim to reduce the ubiquity of "synthetic polymer microparticles" that have the ability to adversely impact human health and the environment.

=== Environmental impacts ===
Crumb rubber is used as a filling in artificial turf fields. In 2007, use in this capacity prevented about 300 million pounds of rubber from polluting landfills. Generally, it takes 20,000–40,000 scrap tires to produce enough filling to cover an average football field (City of Portland, 2008)

Due to its small size, crumb rubber is however considered a significant source of microplastics pollution. A 2022 study uncovered the "potential adverse consequences of extensive rubber crumb application and exposure to environmental conditions." The crumb rubber examined was found to contain high levels of PAHs, as well as zinc at concentrations that may "pose a risk to aquatic organisms in particular".

The Connecticut Department of Environmental Protection found in a 2010 study that stormwater passing through crumb rubber regularly exceeded aquatic acute toxicity for zinc. Additionally, copper, barium, manganese and aluminum were found at elevated levels after stormwater contacted the materials. Semi-volatile organic compounds and PAHs were found to be elevated as well. The levels of most of these compounds were higher than background but were below levels regulated in waterways for environmental protection.

=== Disposal ===
A synthetic turf field has a lifespan of about 10 years, requiring up to 330 million pounds of waste disposal annually from replaced fields. Although the rubber itself is recycled, the crumb is difficult to reuse further and is largely disposed of in landfills.
