= Louise DeKoven Bowen =

American philanthropist and activist (1859–1953)

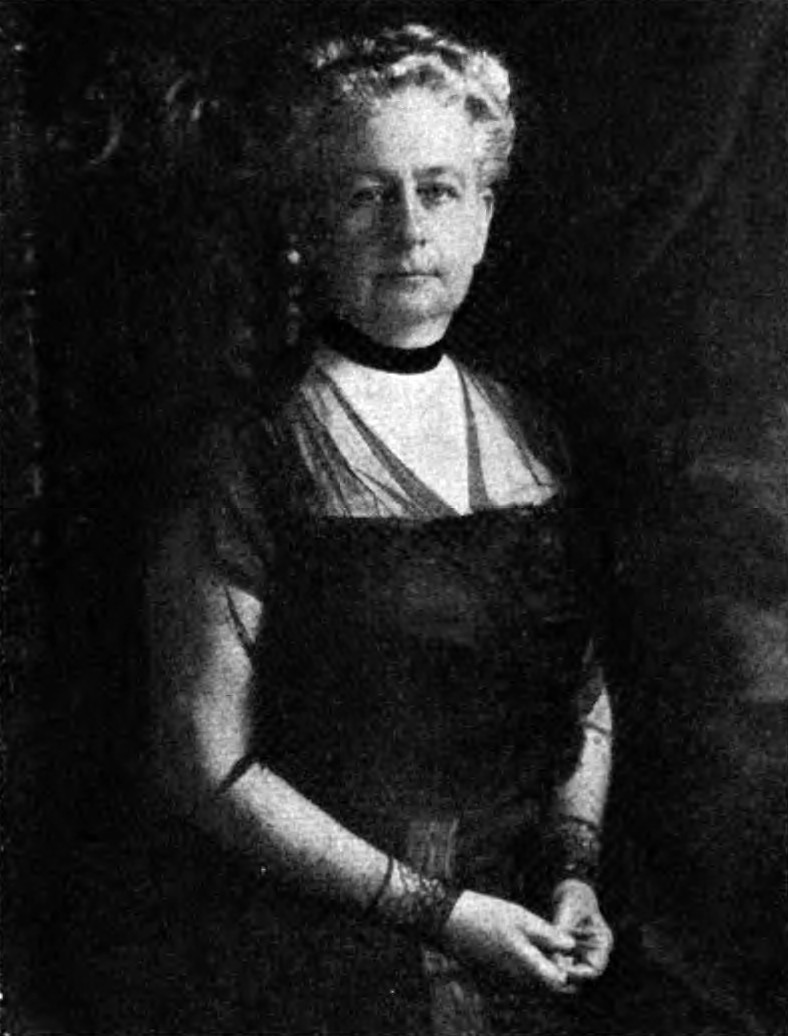
- DeKoven Bowen in 1922
- Born: Louise DeKoven; February 26, 1859; Chicago, Illinois, United States
- Died: November 9, 1953 (aged 94); Chicago, Illinois, US
- Burial place: Graceland Cemetery
- Occupations: Philanthropist; Suffragette; Activist
- Spouse: Joseph Tilton Bowen (m. 1886)
- Children: 4

Louise DeKoven Bowen (Note: also written as deKoven) (February 26, 1859 – November 9, 1953) was an American philanthropist, civic leader, social reformer, and suffragist. She was born to a wealthy family and raised with a strong sense of noblesse oblige. She made substantial financial donations to numerous organizations, raised funds from her association with Chicago's elite families, and while not trained as a social worker, she served in the field as a competent and respected policy maker and administrator. She worked with the settlement movement at Hull House, court reform for youth via the Juvenile Protective Association, and numerous women's clubs and women's suffrage organizations. A primary passion of hers was the reform of dance halls in Chicago. At the end of her 94 years, she had provided care to the impoverished and disenfranchised through her extensive public service and activism, especially attending to "the welfare and betterment of women, children, and their families."

== Early life and education ==
Born in 1859 in Chicago, Illinois, Louise DeKoven Bowen's parents were Helen Hadduck and John deKoven, a banker. In 1875, she graduated from Dearborn Seminary. The granddaughter of Fort Dearborn pioneers, DeKoven was an only child with a large inheritance; she was raised with the expectation that she should give back to her community. Her community service as an adult began at St. James Episcopal Church, where she taught Sunday School and established a boys' club. Though she became frustrated with the limitations for women within the church, she remained a lifelong member.

== Career ==
Bowen's civic involvement extended to secular organizations throughout the city of Chicago, and to leadership positions at both state and national levels.

=== Hull House ===
In 1894 Bowen first became involved in Hull House after being asked by Jane Addams to lead the settlement house's Women's Club. She soon became a Hull House trustee and treasurer, holding the latter position for 53 years. She was a major donor and the primary fundraiser for the organization. She built a Boys' Club building, and in 1912, she endowed a summer camp for Hull House's poor children, the Bowen Country Club in Waukegan, Illinois (now known as Bowen Park). Bowen continued her association with Hull House for the remainder of her professional life; after Jane Addams died in 1935, Bowen was Hull House board president for nine years.

=== Juvenile court system ===
With Julia Lathrop, other reformers, and the Chicago Bar Association, Bowen "successfully lobbied for a new juvenile court in Chicago." This first juvenile court in the United States opened in Chicago in 1899. The Juvenile Court Committee of Chicago helped monitor the new court system, and was part of what was known as the "child-saving movement." Soon, "Bowen succeeded Lathrop as the group's top officer, and during Bowen's seven-year tenure the Court Committee procured the salaries of probation officers, administered the civil service exam used to select probation officers, investigated complaints of neglect, sat in juvenile court to advise judges, and established a juvenile detention home." When the Juvenile Court Committee was reorganized in 1907 into the Juvenile Protective Association, Bowen became its first president. Through this position, which she held for 35 years, Bowen authored numerous studies, including a 1913 report called "The Colored People of Chicago," in which she detailed "racial prejudice and discrimination in education, employment, housing, law enforcement, and entertainment."

=== Woman's suffrage and women's causes ===
Bowen was a leader in the women's suffrage movement in Illinois, serving as president of the Chicago Equal Suffrage Association, vice president of the Illinois Suffrage Association, and auditor of the National Woman's Suffrage Association. The latter role included touring and speaking throughout the country. After Theodore Roosevelt endorsed women's suffrage in his 1912 independent bid for president, Bowen campaigned for him. In 1916, she organized a march of 5,000 women through pouring rain to the Republican National Convention, arriving dramatically just after a speaker had said that women did not want the vote. Along with other upper-class women in leadership positions in the Illinois suffrage movement, Bowen's role as leader and spokesperson helped give the movement legitimacy and was an important factor in the success of Illinois suffrage in 1913.

After women got the vote, Bowen worked to register women voters and encourage women's participation through voting and running for office. She herself almost ran for the Cook County Board and for mayor of Chicago.

Bowen also used her influence as a corporate stockholder to influence policy and treatment of workers. In her autobiographical account, Growing Up With a City, she recounts how she "collected all my arguments regarding women working at night" and personally appealed to International Harvester Company president Cyrus H. McCormick regarding poor working conditions for women and the need for a minimum wage for women in his company's twine mills.

=== Additional civic involvement ===
Bowen's numerous additional civic roles included the presidency of the Chicago Woman's Club, and presidency of the Woman's City Club of Chicago from 1914−1924. "Beginning with her presidency, the Woman's City Club's views on public policy were sought out by both city of Chicago and Cook County officials." She also served as vice president of the United Charities of Chicago. "During World War I, she was the only woman appointed to the Illinois Council of Defense," using her network of women activists to coordinate the war efforts of women's organizations throughout the state. By appointment of President Warren G. Harding, she was the official representative of the US at the Pan-American Conference of Women (1922). After World War II, already in retirement, she continued her activism, which had remained largely unchanged despite major social and political disruption. In fact, the post-war period saw rising affluence, rapid growth of suburban living, among other achievements.

== Honors and awards ==
Bowen received considerable recognition for her public service during her lifetime, including being honored as a citizen-fellow of the Chicago Institute of Medicine in 1939 for her long service to hospitals and health organizations, and receiving the first Gold Medal for Distinguished Service awarded to a woman by the Rotary Club of Chicago in 1941.

== Personal life and death ==
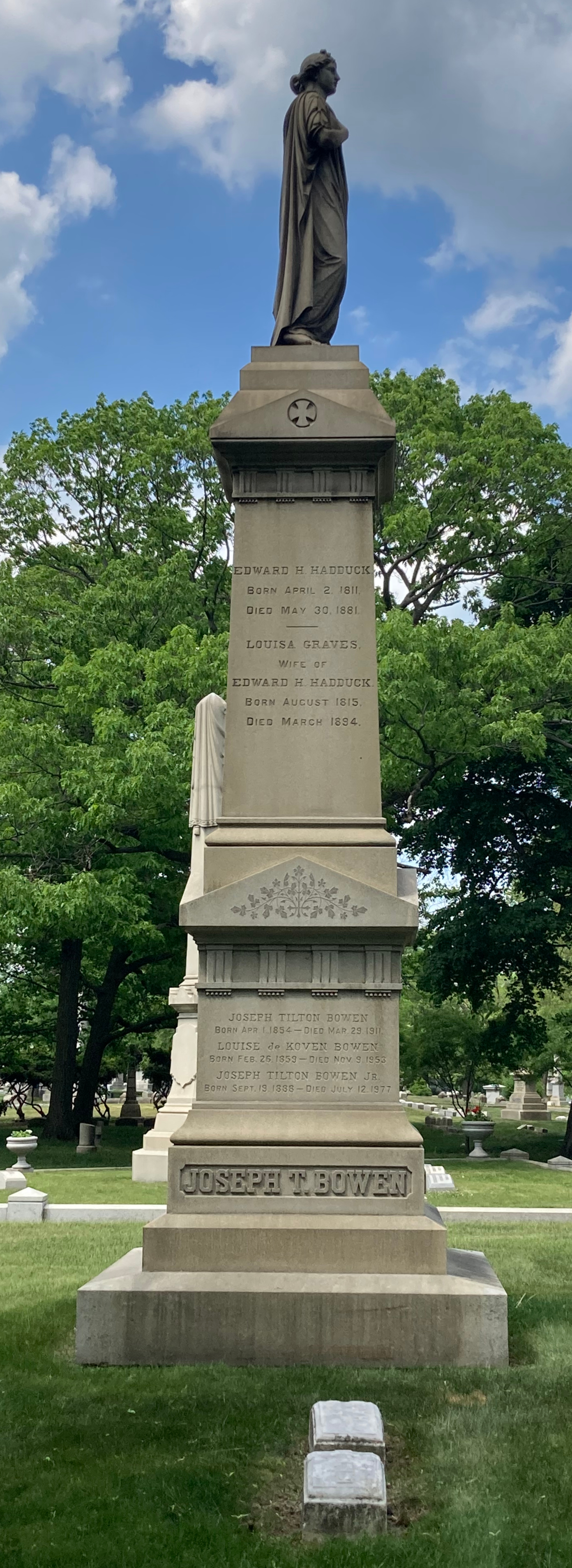
Bowen's grave at Graceland Cemetery

Bowen married the banker, Joseph Tilton Bowen, in 1886. Their four children were John DeKoven Bowen (b. 1887); Joseph Tilton Bowen Jr. (b. 1889); Helen Hadduck Bowen (1890–1972), wife of William M. Blair; and Louise DeKoven Bowen (b. 1892). Bowen died of a stroke in 1953 in Chicago and is buried in Graceland Cemetery.

== Legacy ==
Louise DeKoven Bowen's papers are part of the Richard J. Daley Library Special Collections and University Archives at the University of Illinois at Chicago.

== Selected works ==
- The Colored People of Chicago (1913)
- Safeguards for City Youth at Work and at Play (1914)
- Growing Up With a City (1926)
- Open Window: Stories of People and Places (1946)
