= Playground =

Place designed for children to play

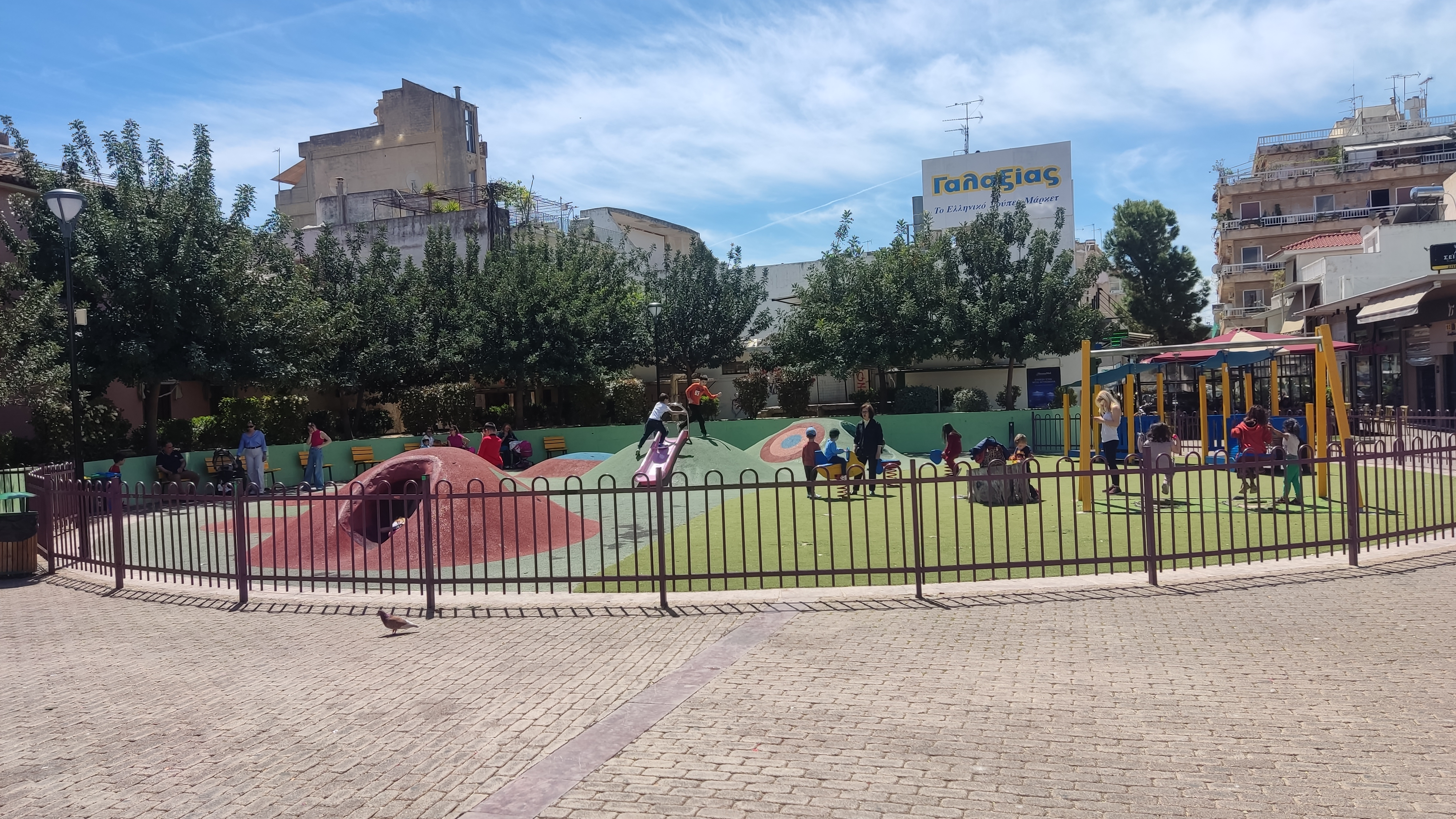
A modern-day playground in Argos, Peloponnese, Greece

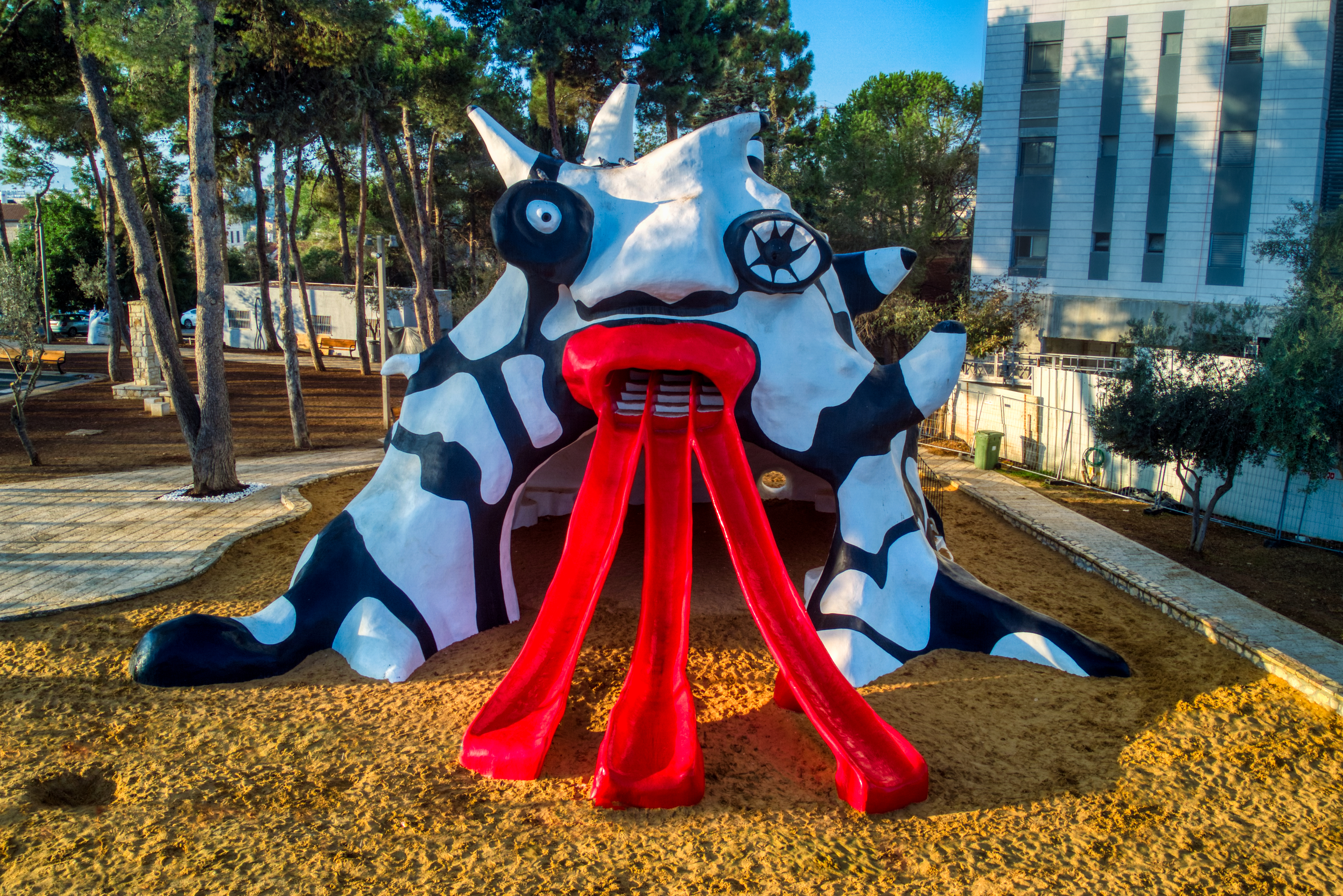
"The Golem" - a giant monster with three red tongues protruding from its mouth, which serve as playground slides, Jerusalem, made by the sculptor Niki de Saint Phalle

A playground, playpark, or play area is a place designed to provide an environment for children that facilitates play, typically outdoors. While playgrounds are usually designed for children, some are designed for other age groups or older people with disabilities. A playground might exclude children below or above a certain age.

Modern playgrounds often have recreational equipment such as the seesaw, merry-go-round, swingset, slide, jungle gym, chin-up bars, sandbox, spring rider, trapeze rings, playhouses, and mazes, many of which help children develop physical coordination, strength, and flexibility, as well as providing recreation and enjoyment and supporting social and emotional development. Common in modern playgrounds are play structures that link many different pieces of equipment.

Playgrounds often also have facilities for playing informal games of adult sports, such as a baseball diamond, a skating arena, a basketball court, or a tether ball.

Public playground equipment is installed in the play areas of parks, schools, childcare facilities, institutions, multiple-family dwellings, restaurants, resorts, recreational developments, and other areas of public use.

A playscape is a type of playground that is designed to provide a safe environment for play in a natural setting.

== History ==
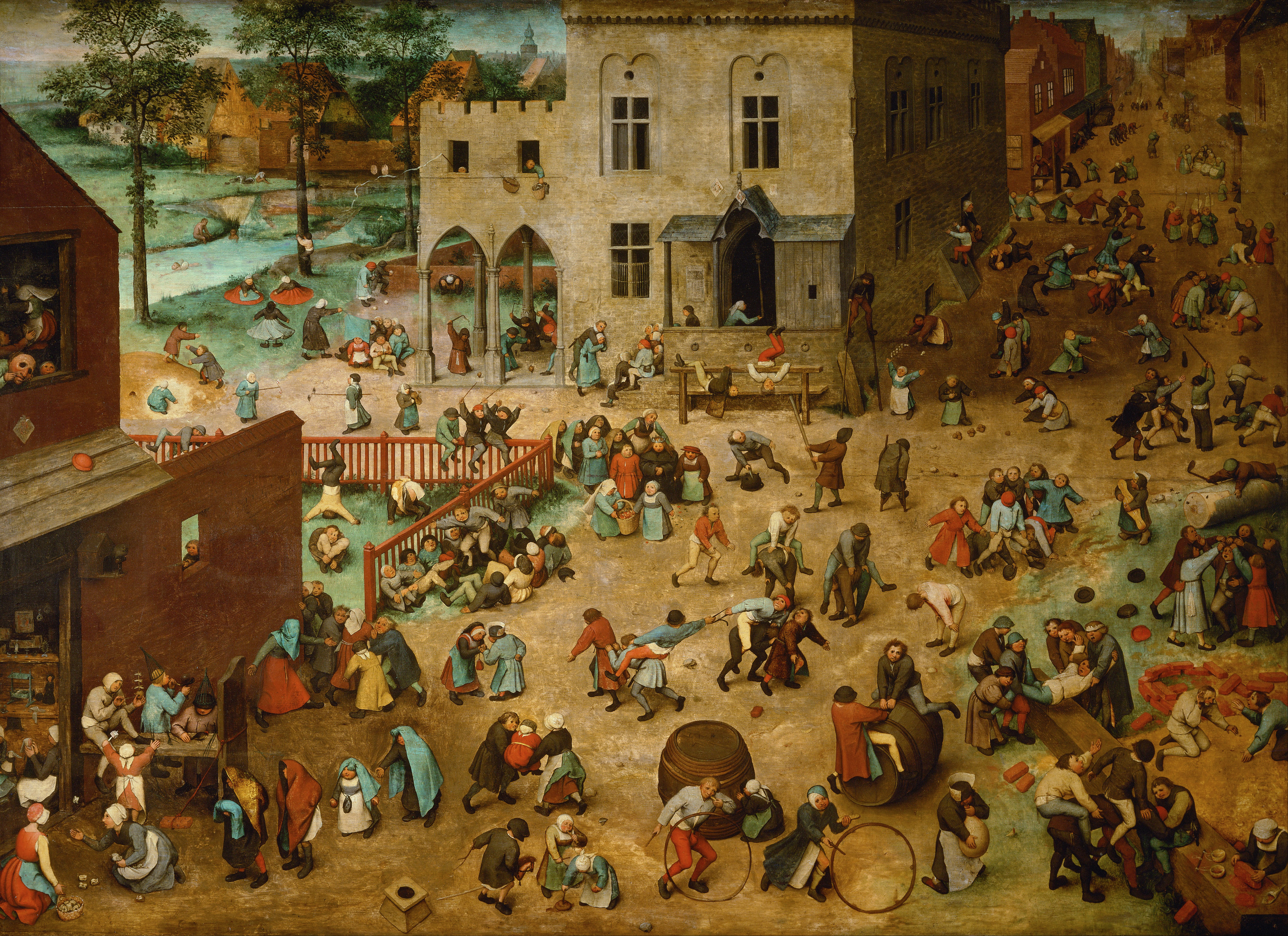
Children's Games (1560)

Throughout history, children have played in their villages and neighbourhoods, especially in the streets and lanes near their homes. The painting Children's Games (1560) shows children playing in multiple ways in the streets and fields of an imaginary Dutch townscape.

=== Nineteenth-century playgrounds ===
In the 19th century, developmental psychologists such as Friedrich Fröbel proposed playgrounds as a developmental aid to instill in children a sense of fair play and good manners. In Germany, a few playgrounds were erected near schools. In the 1840s in Britain, the Home and Colonial Infant School had a playground for pupils that included climbing structures, seesaws, and parallel bars.

Thomas Carlyle called for the establishment of public playgrounds within industrial cities such as Manchester, England, in Past and Present (1843), saying that "every toiling Manchester" ought to have "a hundred acres or so of free greenfield, with trees on it, conquered, for its little children to disport in". The first purpose-built public playgrounds were subsequently created in 1846 in Peel Park in Salford and Queen’s Park and Philips Park in Manchester.

Later in the 19th century, the Metropolitan Public Gardens Association (1882) became an important advocate for children's playgrounds in London, in part at least to provide a steady supply of healthy, strong working-class children for the army, navy, and factories. One of the first playgrounds in the United States was built in San Francisco's Golden Gate Park in 1887.

=== Twentieth century playgrounds ===
==== Playgrounds in Britain ====
The engineer and philanthropist Charles Wicksteed became an important advocate for children's playgrounds from the 1920s onward. He manufactured robust equipment, including swings, slides, and other playground equipment. The National Playing Fields Association also promoted playgrounds across the middle of the century (one of its founding aims was to "secure proper playgrounds for children"), which in their mind equated to manufactured equipment.

In post-war London, pioneering designers, charities and child advocates, including Lady Allen of Hurtwood, popularised the concept of the "junk playground", where children played with rubble, built structures and invented their own entertainment. 'Bombsites and waste ground were transformed into hives of activity by children and progressive educationalists.' Allen campaigned for play facilities for children growing up in the new high-rise developments in Britain's cities and wrote a series of illustrated books on the subject of playgrounds, and at least one book on adventure playgrounds, spaces for free creativity by children, which helped the idea spread worldwide.

In 2019, there were more than 26,000 children's playgrounds in the UK.

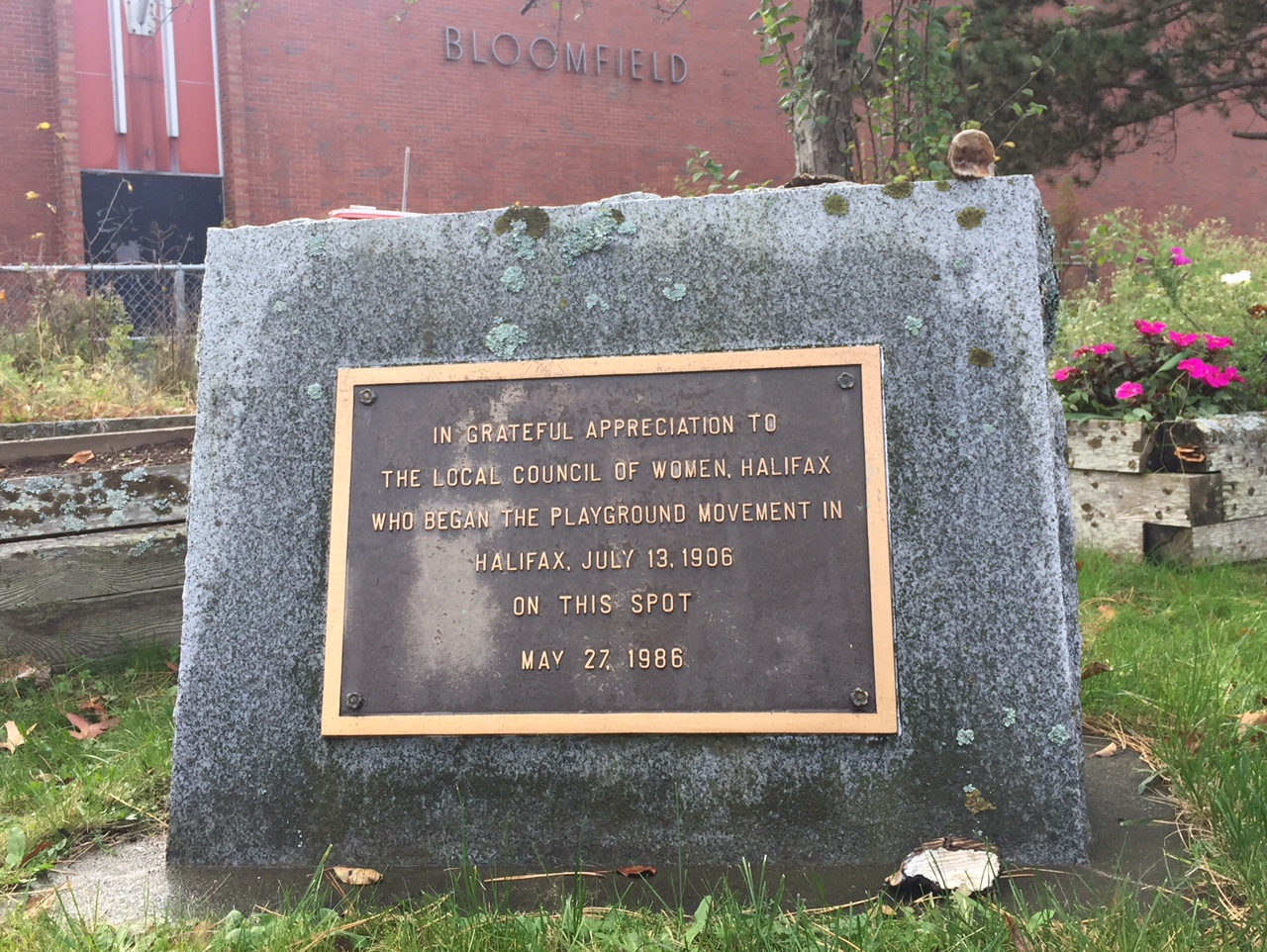
Plaque to mark the spot where the playground movement began in Nova Scotia (1906), Local Council of Women of Halifax, Nova Scotia

==== Playgrounds in North America ====
Over the course of the 20th century, the street increasingly lost its role as the default public space for children's play. It was planned for motor-car use, with momentum building to remove children from the new dangers and confine them to segregated areas to play. Organisations such as the National Highway Protective Society highlighted the number of deaths caused by automobiles. They urged the creation of playgrounds, aiming to free streets for vehicles rather than children's play. The Outdoor Recreation League provided funds to erect playgrounds on parkland, especially following the 1901 publication of a report on numbers of children being run down by cars in New York City.

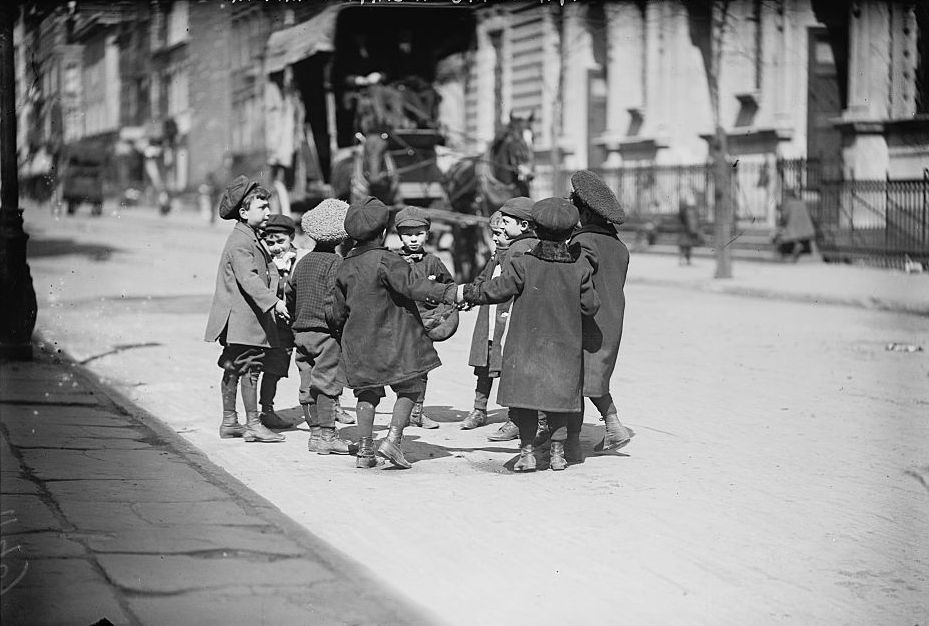
Young boys playing in a New York City street, 1909

In tandem with the new concern about the danger of roads, educational theories of play, including those of Herbert Spencer and John Dewey, inspired the emergence of the reformist playground movement, which argued that playgrounds had educational value, improved attention in class, enhanced physical health, and reduced truancy. Interventionist programs, such as those by the child savers, sought to move children into controlled areas to limit 'delinquency'. Meanwhile, at schools and settlement houses for poorer children with limited access to education, health services, and daycare, playgrounds were included to support these institutions' goal of keeping children safe and out of trouble.

In 1906 the Playground Association of America was founded and a year later Luther Gulick became president. It later became the National Recreation Association and then the National Recreation and Park Association. Urging the need for playgrounds, former President Theodore Roosevelt stated in 1907:

City streets are unsatisfactory playgrounds for children because of the danger, because most good games are against the law, because they are too hot in summer, and because in crowded sections of the city they are apt to be schools of crime. Neither do small back yards nor ornamental grass plots meet the needs of any but the very small children. Older children who play vigorous games must have places set aside especially for them, and, since play is a fundamental need, playgrounds should be provided for every child as much as schools. This means that they must be distributed over the cities in such a way as to be within walking distance of every boy and girl, as most children can not afford to pay carfare

==== Playgrounds in the Soviet Union ====
Playgrounds were an integral part of urban culture in the USSR. In the 1970s and 1980s, there were playgrounds in almost every park in many Soviet cities. Playground apparatus was reasonably standard across the country; most consisted of metal bars with relatively few wooden parts and were manufactured in state-owned factories. Some of the most common constructions were the carousel, sphere, seesaw, rocket, bridge, etc.

== Design ==
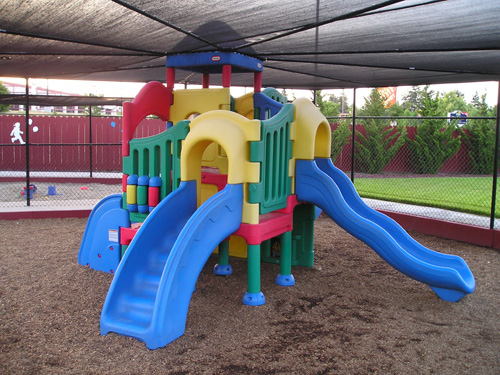
Combination playground structure for small children; slides, climbers (stairs in this case), playhouse

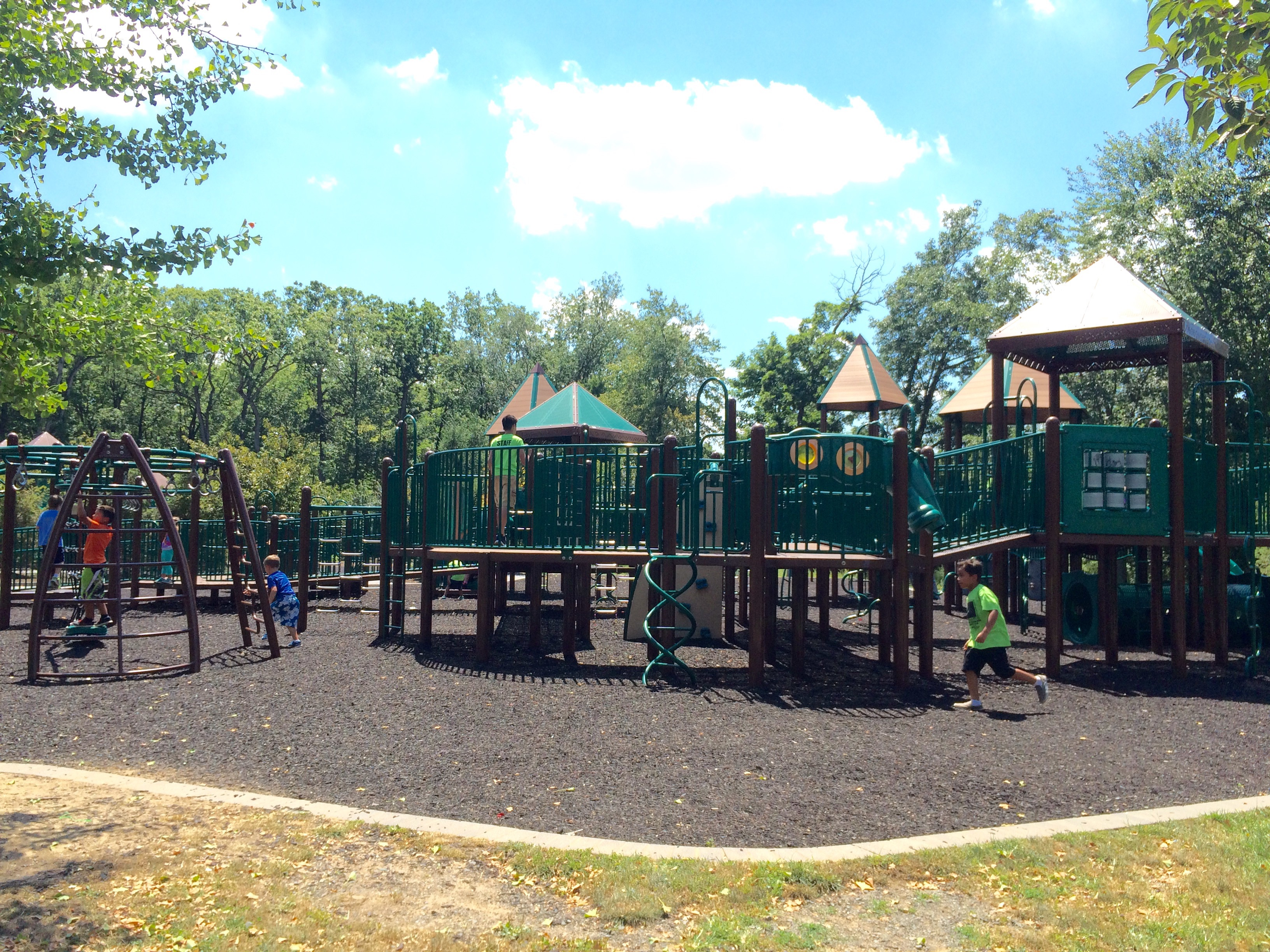
The playground at Van Saun Park in Paramus, New Jersey

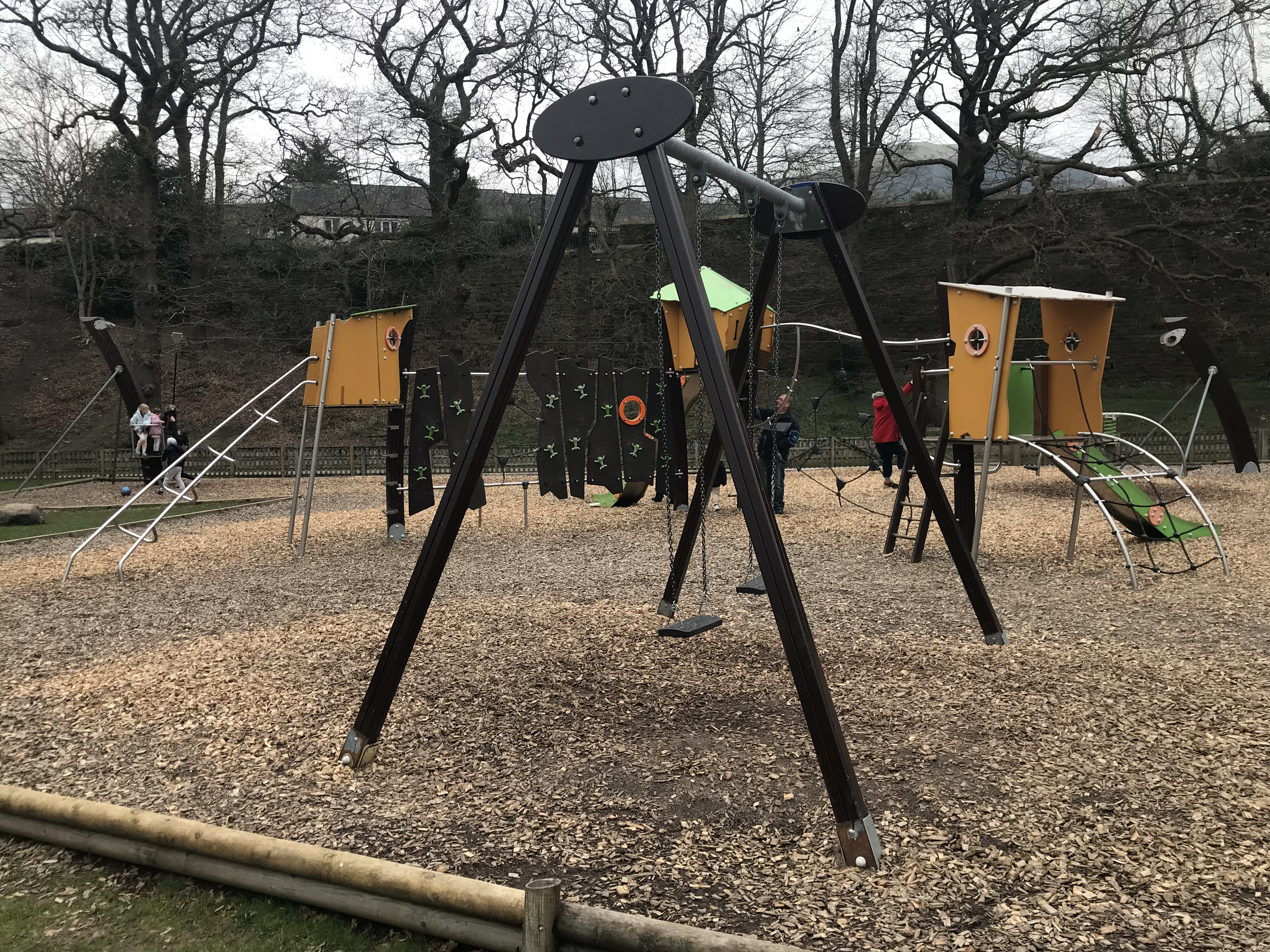
The playground at Fitz Park in Keswick, Cumbria

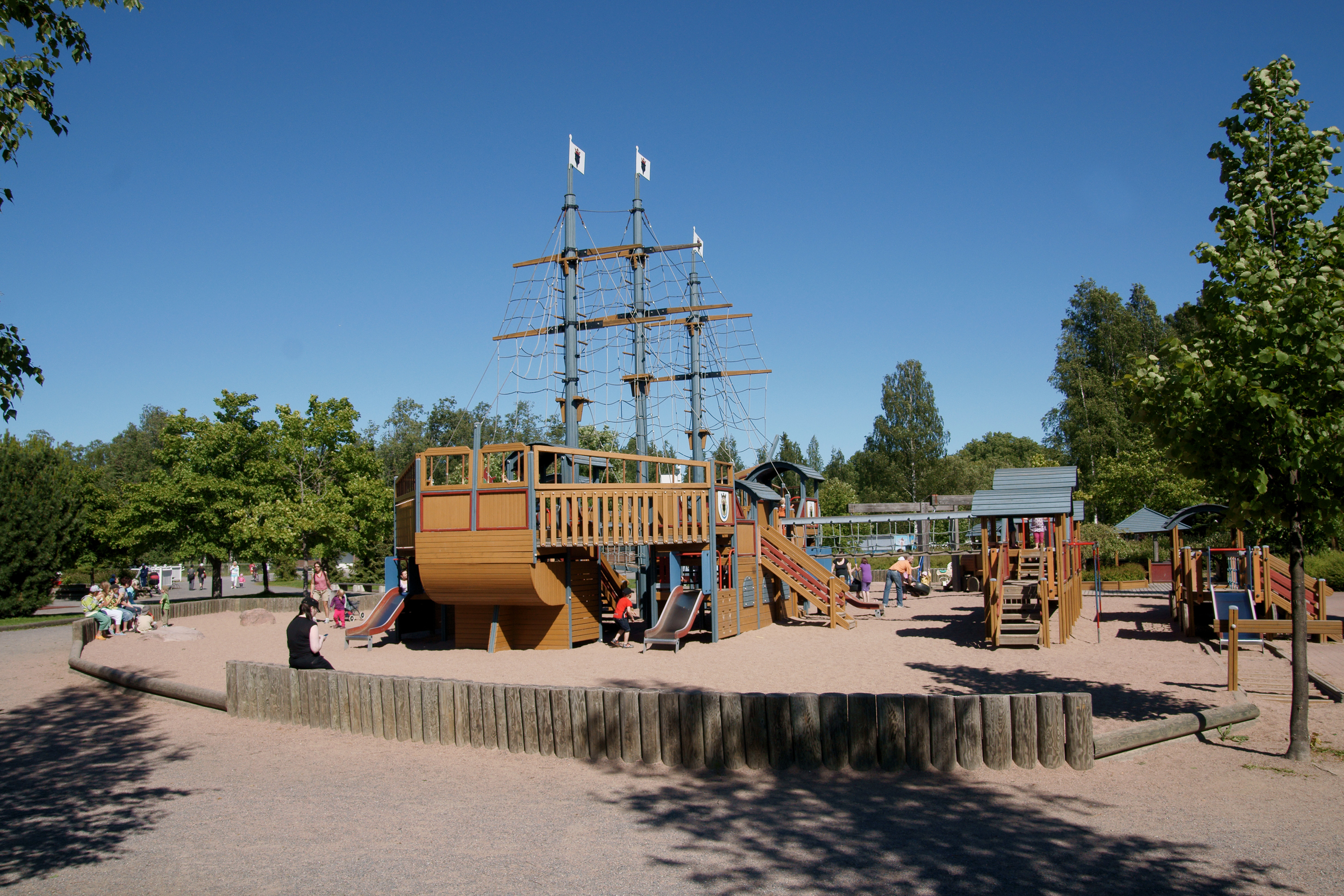
A "sailing ship" in Pelle Hermanni park in Pori, Finland

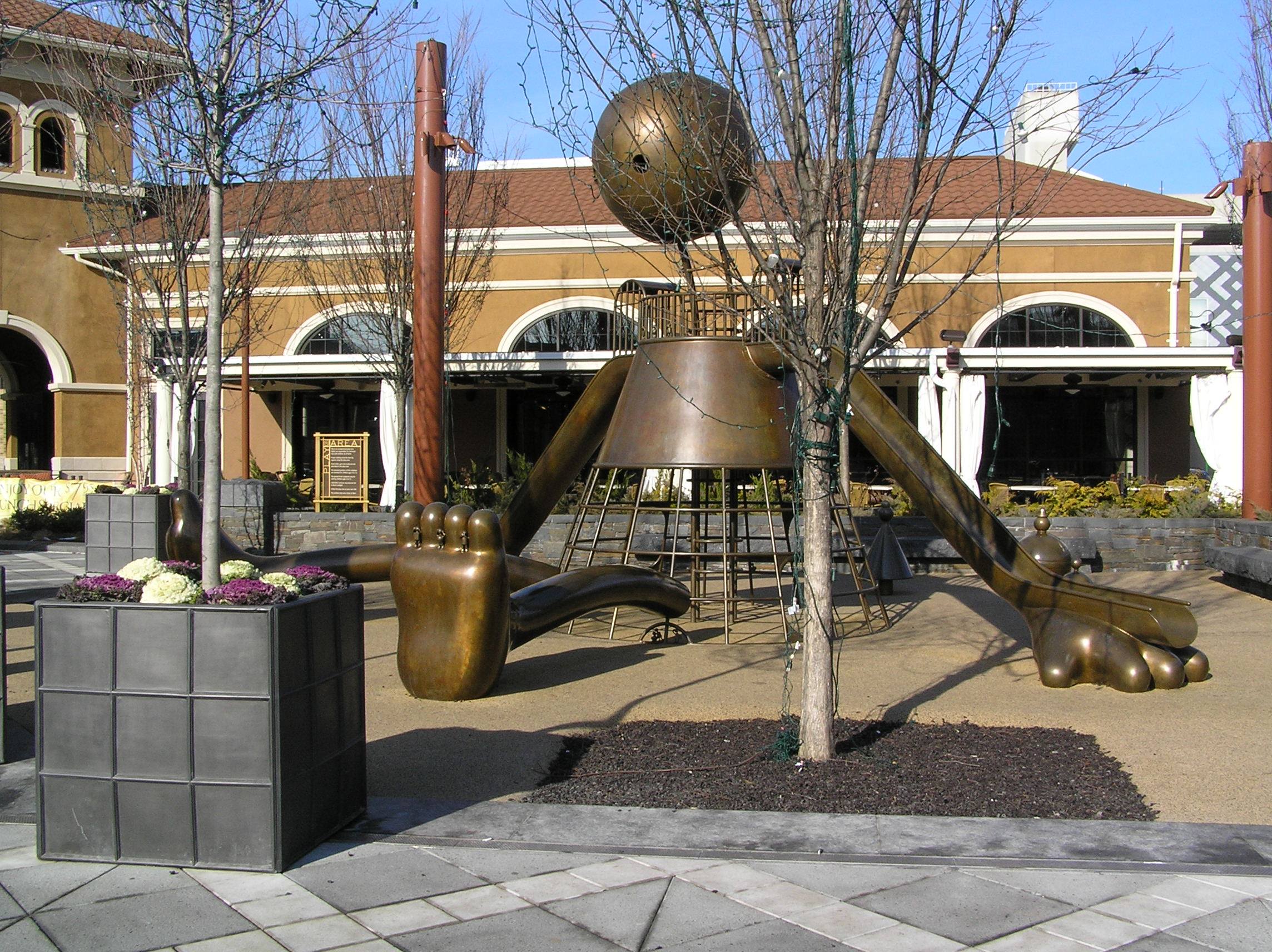
Playground in Yonkers, New York

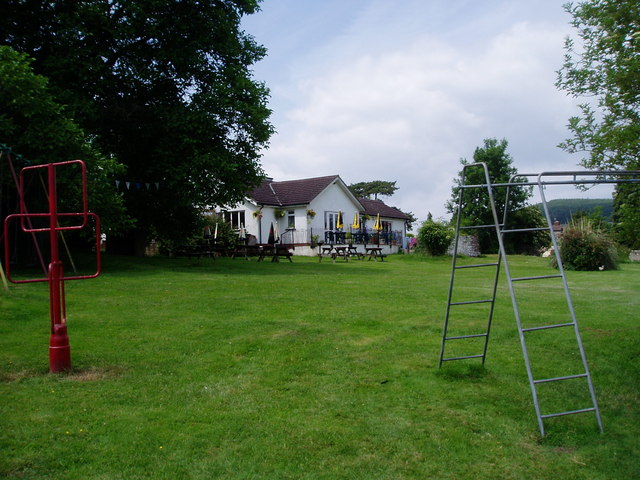
The Royal Oak, Monmouth playground

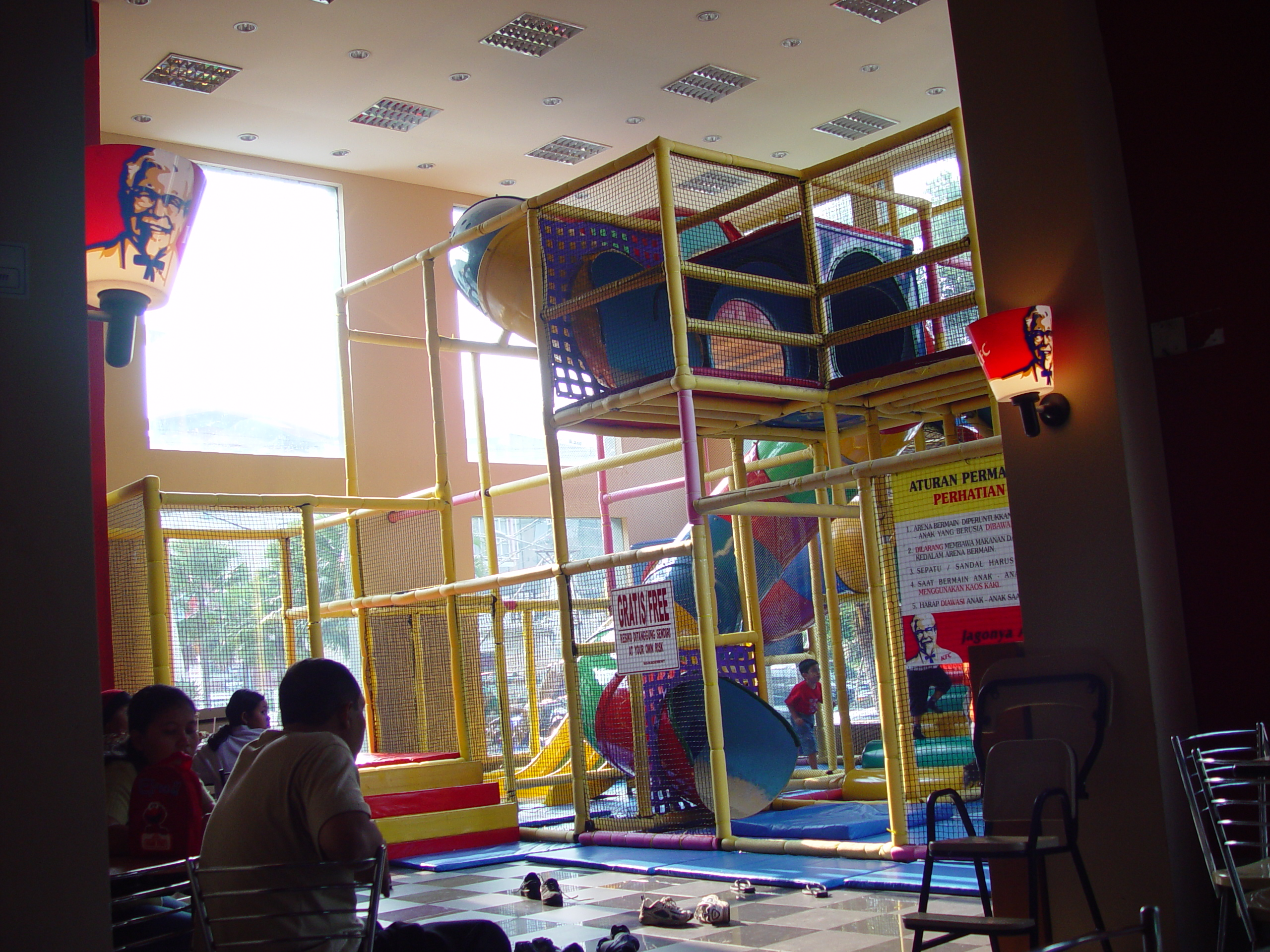
A playground at a fast food restaurant in Jakarta, Indonesia

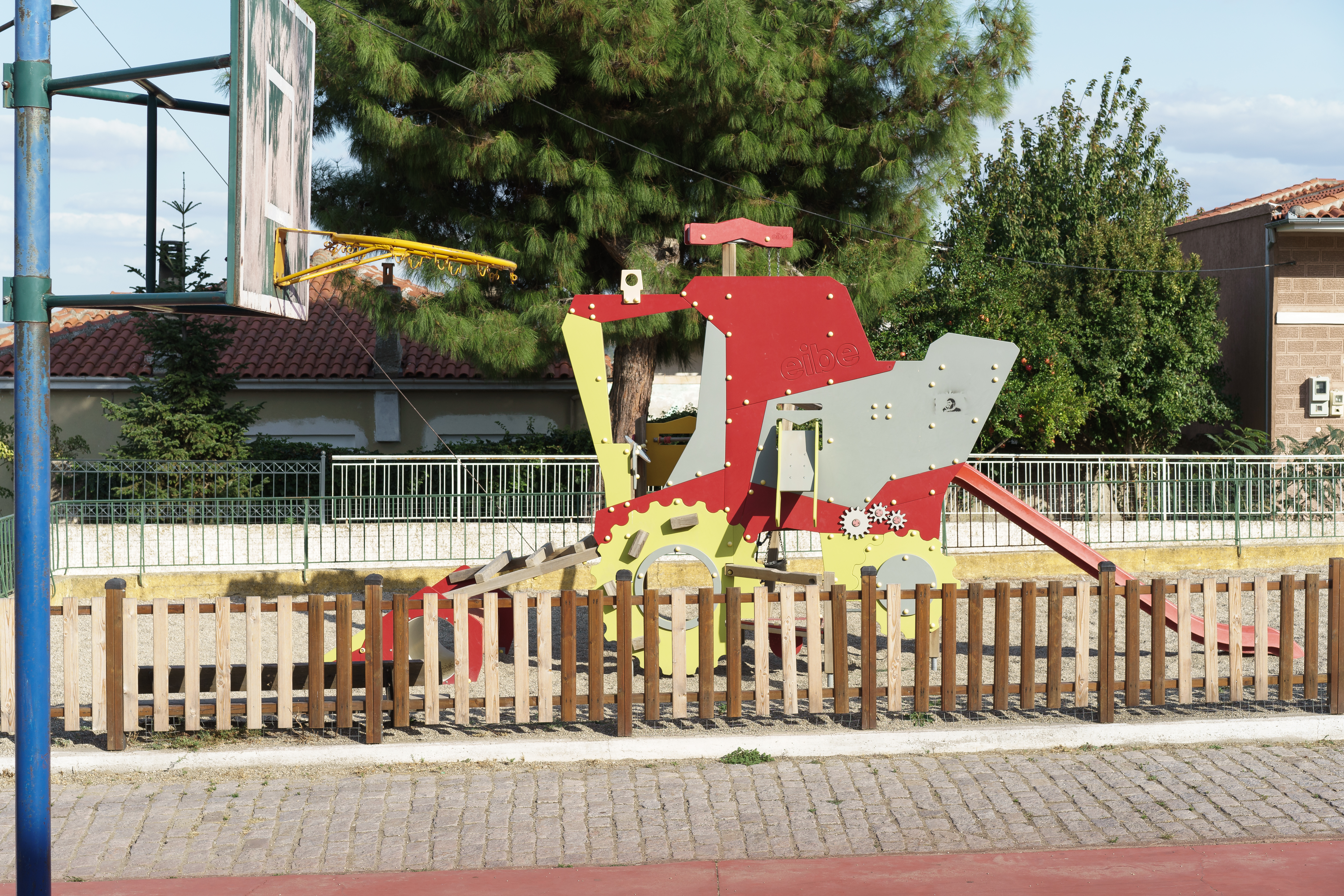
Thematic playground with agricultural machine

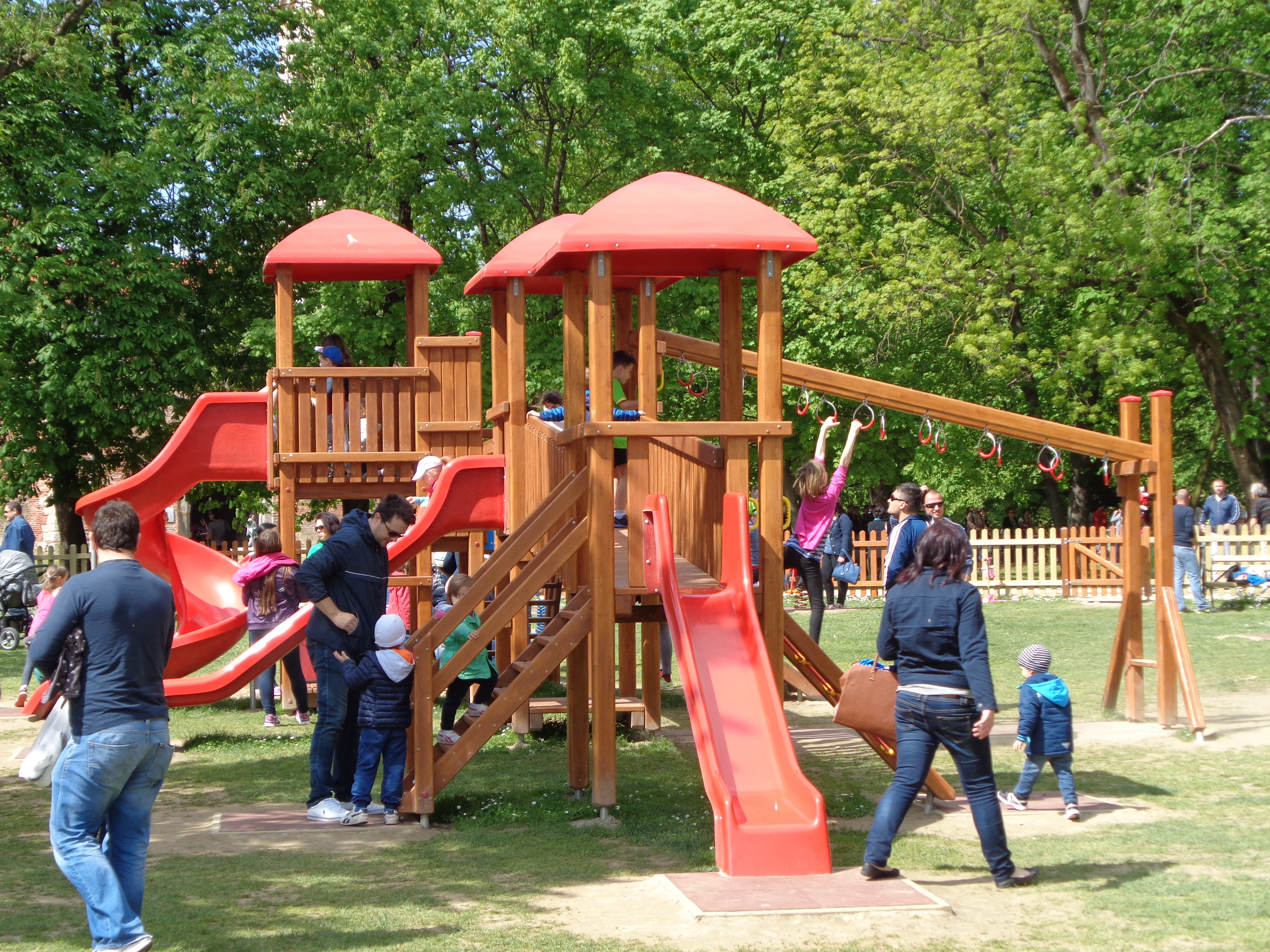
Playground slides at Zrinski Park in Čakovec, Croatia

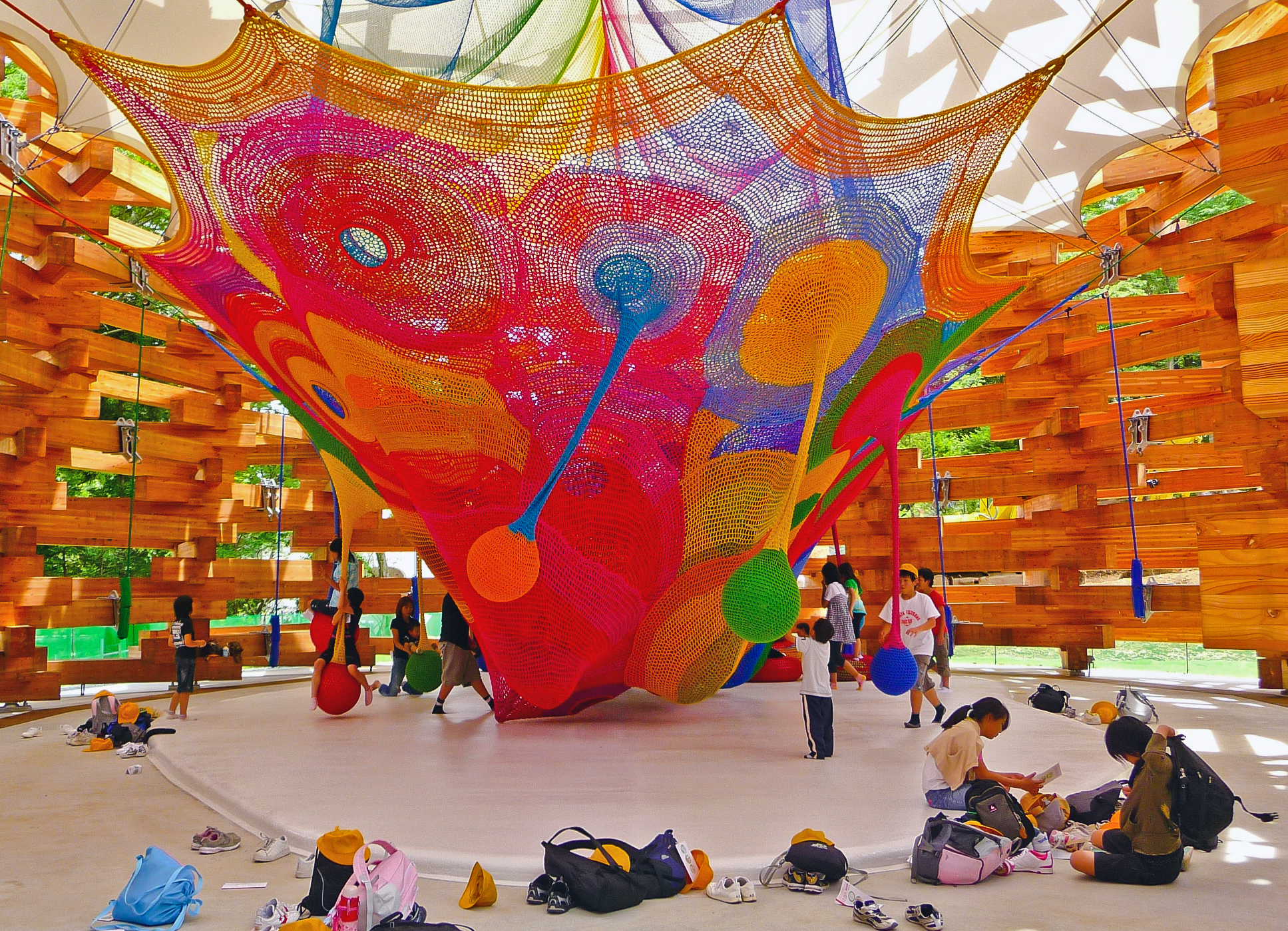
Playground at Fuji-Hakone-Izu National Park

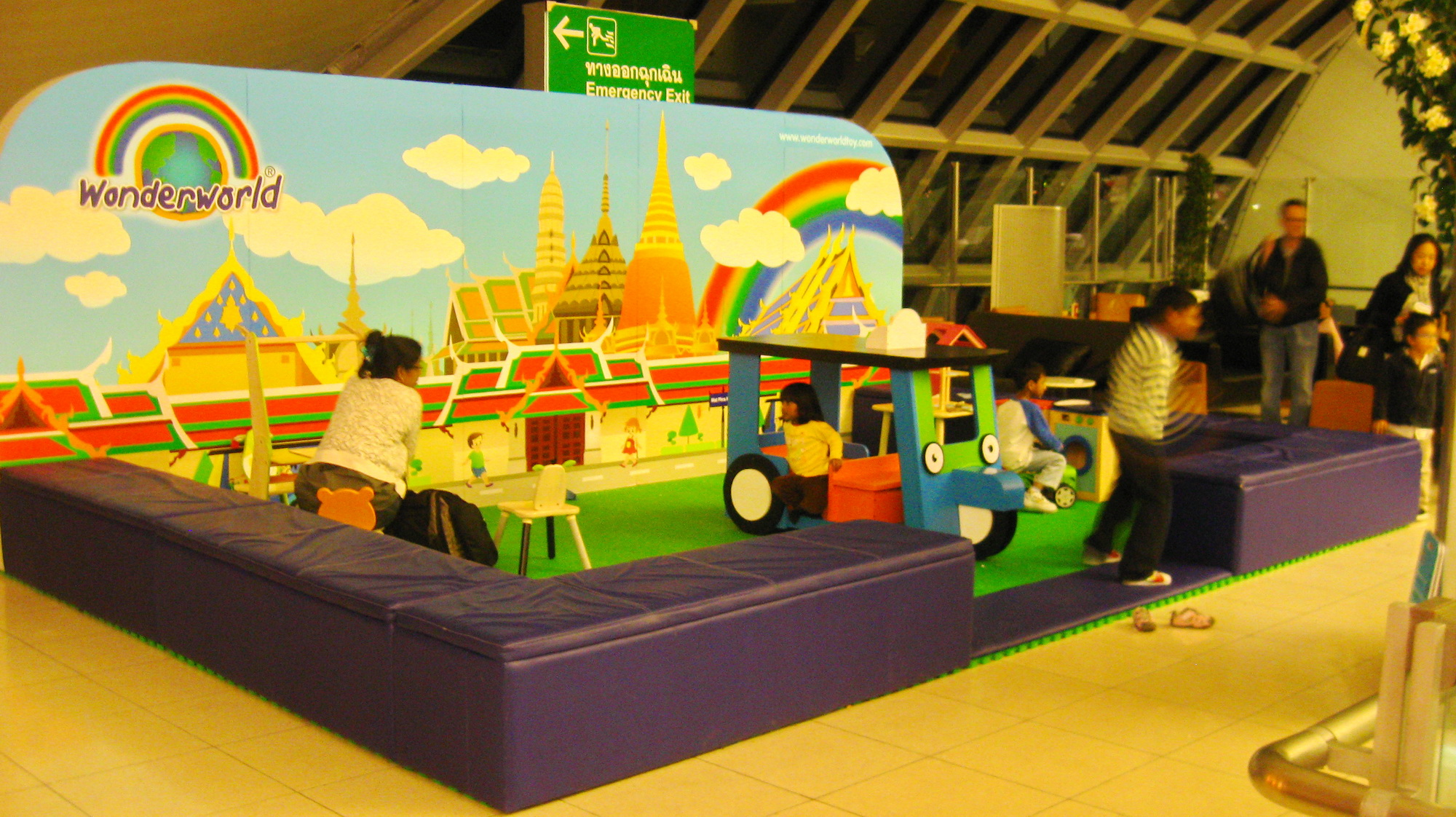
The Wonder World play area at the departure lounge of Suvarnabhumi International Airport, Bangkok

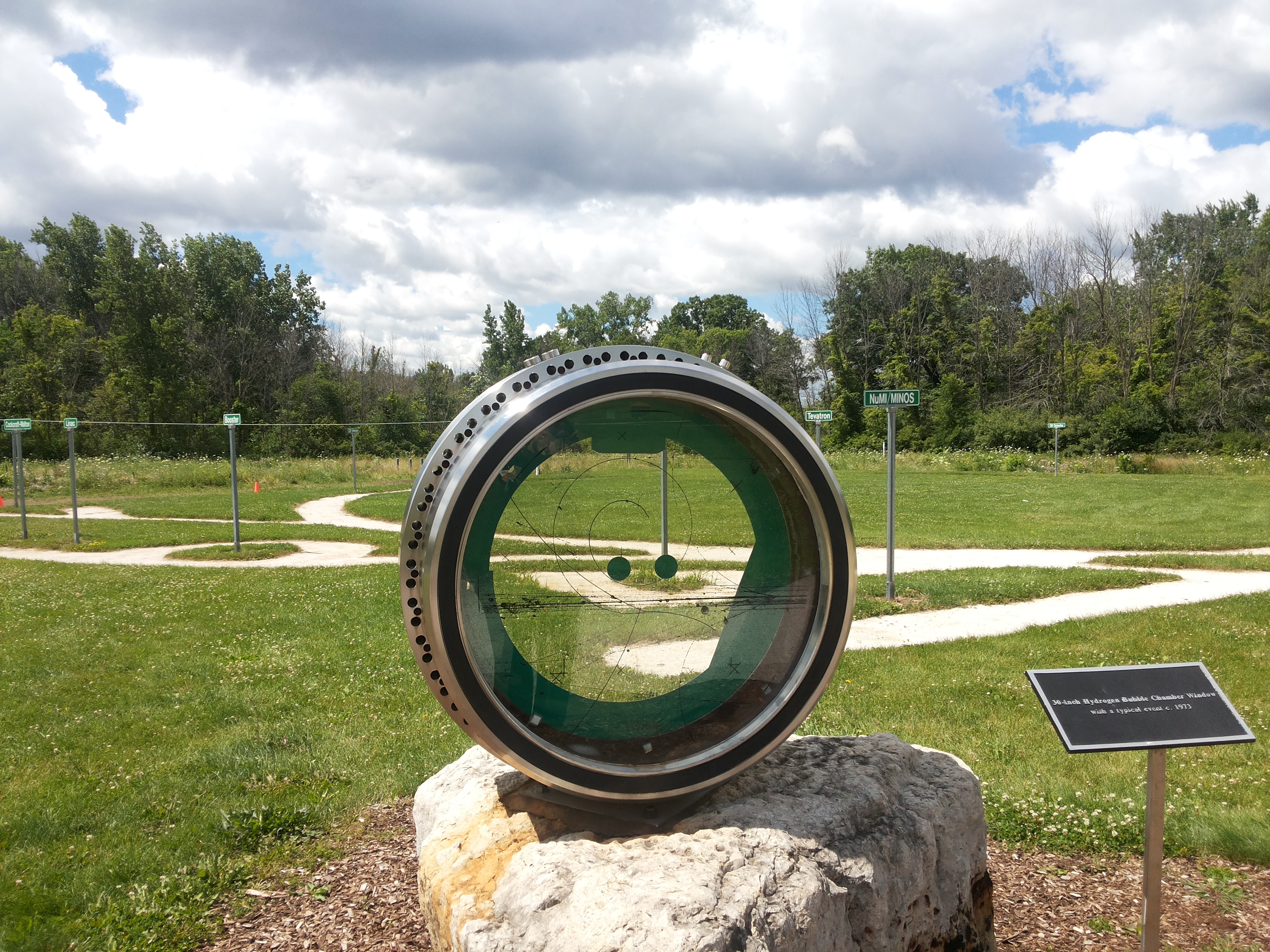
The playground at Fermilab includes a bubble chamber model and a path resembling that followed by protons in a collider.

The intended purpose and audience influence playground design. Separate play areas might be offered to accommodate very young children.

== Effects on child development ==
Professionals recognize that the social skills children develop on the playground often become lifelong skill sets that carry forward into adulthood. Independent research concludes that playgrounds are among the most important environments for children outside the home. Most forms of play are essential for healthy development, but free, spontaneous play—the kind that occurs on playgrounds—is the most beneficial.

Exciting, engaging, and challenging playground equipment is essential for keeping children happy while still developing their learning abilities. These should be designed to suit different groups of children at various stages of learning, such as specialist playground equipment for nursery & preschool children to teach basic numeracy & vocabulary, or to build a child's creativity and imagination through role-play panels or puzzles.

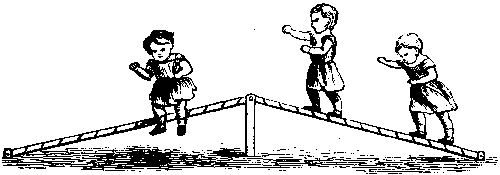
Rope bridge for improving balance

There is a consensus that physical activity reduces the risk of psychological problems in children and fosters their self-esteem. The American Chief Medical Officer's report (Department of Health, 2004), stated that a review of available research suggests that the health benefits of physical activity in children are predominantly seen in the amelioration of risk factors for disease, avoidance of weight gain, achieving a peak bone mass and mental well-being.

Exercise programmes "may have short term beneficial effects on self esteem in children and adolescents" although high-quality trials are lacking.

Commentators argue that the quality of a child's exercise experience can affect their self-esteem. Ajzen's TPB (1991) posits that children's self-esteem is enhanced through encouragement of physical mastery and self-development. It can be seen that playgrounds provide an ideal opportunity for children to master physical skills, such as swinging, balancing, and climbing. Personal development may be gained through the enhancement of skills, such as playing, communicating, and cooperating with other children and adults in the playground.

Controlled risk in play at a playground helps children develop skills to assess physical risk and can reduce injury later in life.

Children have devised many playground games and pastimes. But because playgrounds are usually subject to adult supervision and oversight, young children's street culture often struggles to thrive there fully. Research by Robin Moore concluded that playgrounds need to be balanced with marginal areas that (to adults) appear to be derelict or wasteground, but to children they are areas that they can claim for themselves, ideally a wooded area or field.

For many children, it is their favorite time of day when they get to be on the playground for free time or recess. It serves as a release from the pressures of learning during the day. They know that time on the playground is their own time.

A type of playground called a playscape can provide children with the necessary feeling of ownership that Moore describes above. Playscapes can also provide parents with assurance about their child's safety and well-being, which may not be as prevalent in an open field or wooded area.

== Funding ==
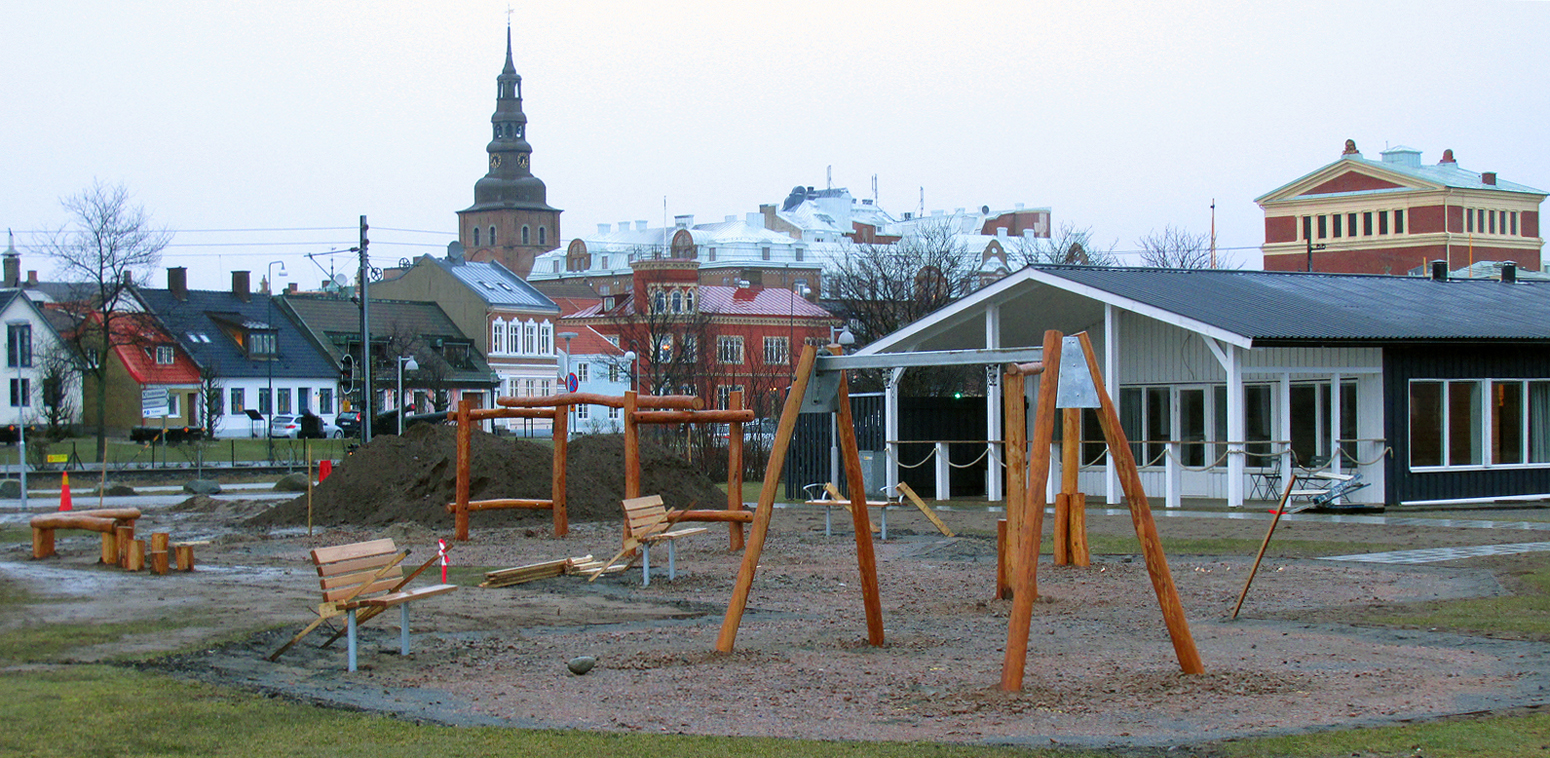
A playground under construction in Ystad, Sweden in 2016

In the UK, several organisations provide funding for schools and local authorities to construct playgrounds. These include the Biffa Award, which provides funding under the Small Grants Scheme; Funding Central, which offers support for voluntary organisations and social enterprises; and the Community Construction Fund, a flagship programme by Norfolk County Council.

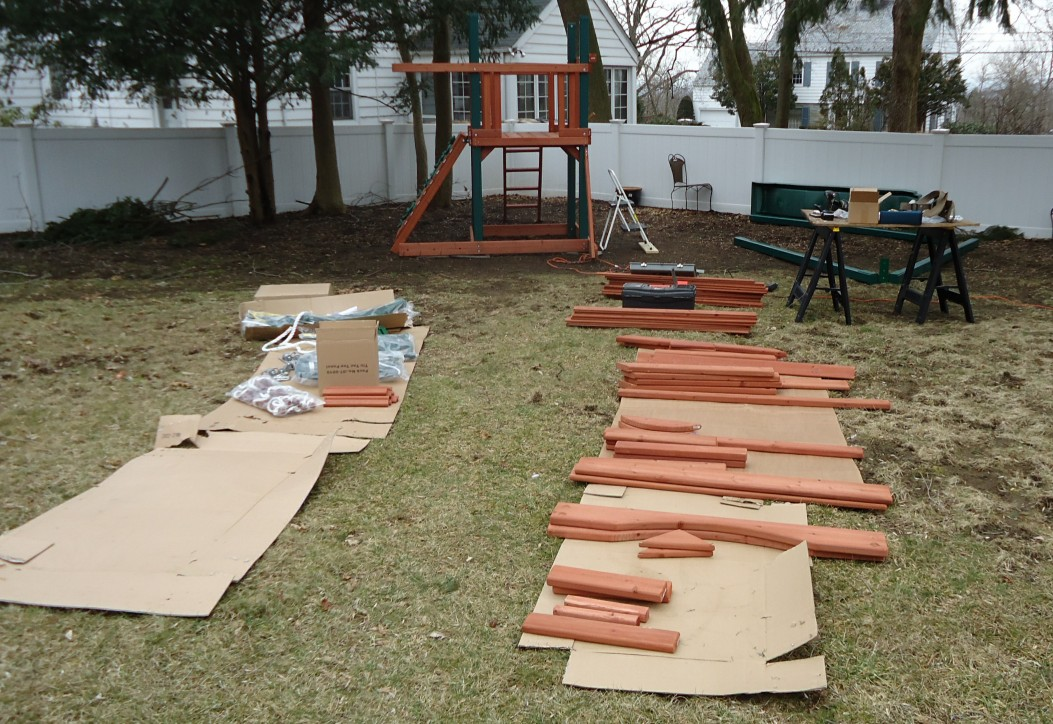
A playground being built for a homeowner's backyard as part of a handyman project. Modern playgrounds can have many options besides swingsets, including sandboxes, rope-climbs, tic-tac-toe games, a fort with dormer roofs and a chimney, a slide, and other amenities.

== Safety ==
Safety in the context of playgrounds is generally understood as preventing injuries. Risk aversion and fear of lawsuits on the part of the adults who design playgrounds prioritize injury prevention over other factors, such as cost or developmental benefits to users. It is essential that children gradually develop the skill of risk assessment, and a completely safe environment does not allow that.

Sometimes the safety of playgrounds is disputed in schools or among regulators. Over at least the last twenty years, the kinds of equipment found in playgrounds have changed, often towards safer equipment made of plastic. For example, an older jungle gym might be constructed entirely from steel bars, while newer ones tend to have a minimal steel framework while providing a web of nylon ropes for children to climb on. Playgrounds with equipment that may cause children to fall often use rubber mulch on the ground to help cushion the impact.

Playgrounds are also made differently for different age groups. Often, schools have a taller, more advanced playground for older schoolchildren and a lower playground with a lower risk of falling for younger children.

Safety discussions do not normally include an evaluation of the unintended consequences of injury prevention, such as older children who do not exercise at the playground because the playground is too boring.

Safety efforts sometimes paradoxically increase the likelihood and severity of injuries because of how people choose to use playground equipment. For example, older children may choose to climb on the outside of a "safe" but boring play structure rather than using it as the designers intended. Similarly, rather than letting young children play on playground slides by themselves, some injury-averse parents seat the children on their laps and go down the slide together. This seems safer at first glance, but if the child's shoe catches on the edge of the slide, this arrangement frequently results in the child's leg being broken. If the child had been permitted to use the slide independently, then this injury would not have happened, because when the shoe caught, the child would have stopped sliding rather than being propelled down the slide by the adult's weight.

Also, regarding playground safety, the materials used in their construction are essential. Wooden playgrounds offer a more natural environment for children to play, but can also cause even minor injuries. Slivers are the primary concern when building with wood material. Wet weather is also a threat to children playing on wooden structures. Most woods are treated and do not wear out terribly quickly, but with enough rain, wooden playgrounds can become slippery and dangerous for children.

=== Regulation ===
In the United States, the Consumer Product Safety Commission and the American National Standards Institute have created a Standardized Document and Training System for certification of Playground Safety Inspectors. These regulations are nationwide and provide a basis for safe playground installation and maintenance practices. ASTM F1487-07 addresses specific requirements for playground layout, use zones, and various test criteria for determining playground safety. ASTM F2373 covers public-use play equipment for children 6–24 months old. This information can be applied effectively only by a trained C.P.S.I. A National Listing of Trained Playground Safety Inspectors is available for many states. A Certified Playground Safety Inspector (CPSI) is a career that was developed by the National Playground Safety Institute (NPSI) and is recognized nationally by the National Recreation and Park Association or N.R.P.A. (Some information sources offer interactive examples of playground equipment that violates CPSC guidelines.)

In Australia, Standards Australia is responsible for publishing the playground safety Standards AS/NS4422, AS/NZS4486.1, and AS4685 Parts 1 to 6. The University of Technology Sydney is responsible for the training and accreditation of playground inspectors. The Register of Playground Inspectors Australia lists all the individuals who have been certified to inspect playgrounds within Australia.

European Standards EN 1177 specifies the requirements for surfaces used in playgrounds. For each material type and equipment height, it specifies the minimum required depth of material. EN 1176 covers playground equipment standards. In the UK, playground inspectors can sit the examinations of the Register of Play Inspectors International at the three required levels - routine, operational and annual. Annual inspectors can undertake the post-installation inspections recommended by EN 1176.

=== Prevention strategies ===
Because the majority of playground injuries are due to falls from equipment, injury prevention efforts are primarily directed at reducing the likelihood of a child falling and reducing the possibility of a severe injury if the child does fall. This is done by:

- reducing the maximum fall height of equipment, primarily by reducing the overall height of anything a child might climb on or into;
- reducing the likelihood of falling from equipment, through using barriers, discouraging climbing, and making upper surfaces inconvenient or uncomfortable for climbing or sitting on; and
- installing a more flexible surface under and around play equipment, so that a child who falls is less likely to break a bone.

Experts debate how effective these strategies are at preventing injuries, because when playgrounds are made from padded materials, children often take more risks.

=== Playground injury ===
Each year, emergency departments treat more than 200,000 children ages 14 and younger for playground-related injuries. Approximately 156,040 (75.8%) of the 1999 injuries occurred on equipment designed for public use; 46,930 (22.8%) occurred on equipment designed for home use; and 2,880 (1.4%) occurred on homemade playground equipment (primarily rope swings).

Percentage of injuries involving public equipment

- About 46% occurred in schools.
- About 31% occurred in public parks.
- About 10% occurred in commercial childcare centers.
- About 3% occurred in home childcare.
- About 3% occurred in apartment complexes.
- About 2% occurred in fast food restaurants.
- About 9% occurred in other locations.

From January 1990 to August 2000, CPSC received reports of 147 deaths of children younger than 15 that involved playground equipment.

- 70% of those deaths occurred at home
- 30% of those deaths occurred in public use

Girls were involved in a slightly higher percentage of injuries (55%) than were boys (45%).

Injuries to the head and face accounted for 49% of injuries to children 0–4, while injuries to the arm and hand accounted for 49% of injuries to children ages 5–14. Approximately 15% of the injuries were classified as severe, with 3% requiring hospitalization. The most prevalent diagnoses were fractures (39%), lacerations (22%), contusions/abrasions (20%), and strains/sprains (11%).

For children ages 0–4, climbers (40%) had the highest incidence rates, followed by slides (33%). For children ages 5–14, climbing equipment (56%) had the highest incidence rates, followed by swings (24%). Most injuries on public playground equipment occurred on climbing equipment (53%), swings (19%), and slides (17%).

Falls to the surface were a contributing factor in 79% of all injuries. On home equipment, 81% were associated with falls.

In 1995, playground-related injuries among children ages 14 and younger cost an estimated $1.2 billion.

On public playgrounds, more injuries occur on climbers than on any other equipment. On home playgrounds, swings are responsible for most injuries.

Playgrounds in low-income areas have more maintenance-related hazards than playgrounds in high-income areas. For example, playgrounds in low-income areas had significantly more trash, rusty play equipment, and damaged fall surfaces.

=== Unintended consequences ===
As a result of what some experts say is over-protectiveness driven by a fear of lawsuits, playgrounds have been designed to be, or at least to appear, excessively safe. This overprotectiveness may protect the playground owner from lawsuits, but it appears to result in a decreased sense of achievement and increased fears in children.

The equipment limitations result in the children receiving less value from playtime. Enclosed, padded, constrained, low structures may prevent children from taking risks and developing a sense of mastery over their environment. Successfully taking a risk is empowering to children. For example, a child climbing to the top of a tall jungle gym may feel happy about completing the challenging climb and experience the thrill of being in a precarious, high position. By contrast, the child on a low piece of equipment, designed to reduce the incidence of injuries from falls, experiences no such thrill, sense of mastery, or accomplishment. Additionally, a lack of experience with heights as a child is associated with increased acrophobia (fear of heights) in adults.

The appearance of safety encourages unreasonable risk-taking in children, who might take more reasonable risks if they correctly understood that it is possible to break a bone on the soft surfaces under most modern equipment.

Finally, the playground, designed to appear low-risk, may be boring, especially to older children. As a result, they tend to seek out alternative play areas, which may be very unsafe.

Risk management is an important life skill, and risk aversion in playgrounds is unhelpful in the long term. Experts studying child development, including Tim Gill, have written about the overprotective bias in the provision for children, particularly in playgrounds. Instead of a constructed playground, allowing children to play in a natural environment such as open land or a park is sometimes recommended; children gain a better sense of balance playing on uneven ground, and learn to interpret the complexity and signals of nature more effectively.

== Types ==
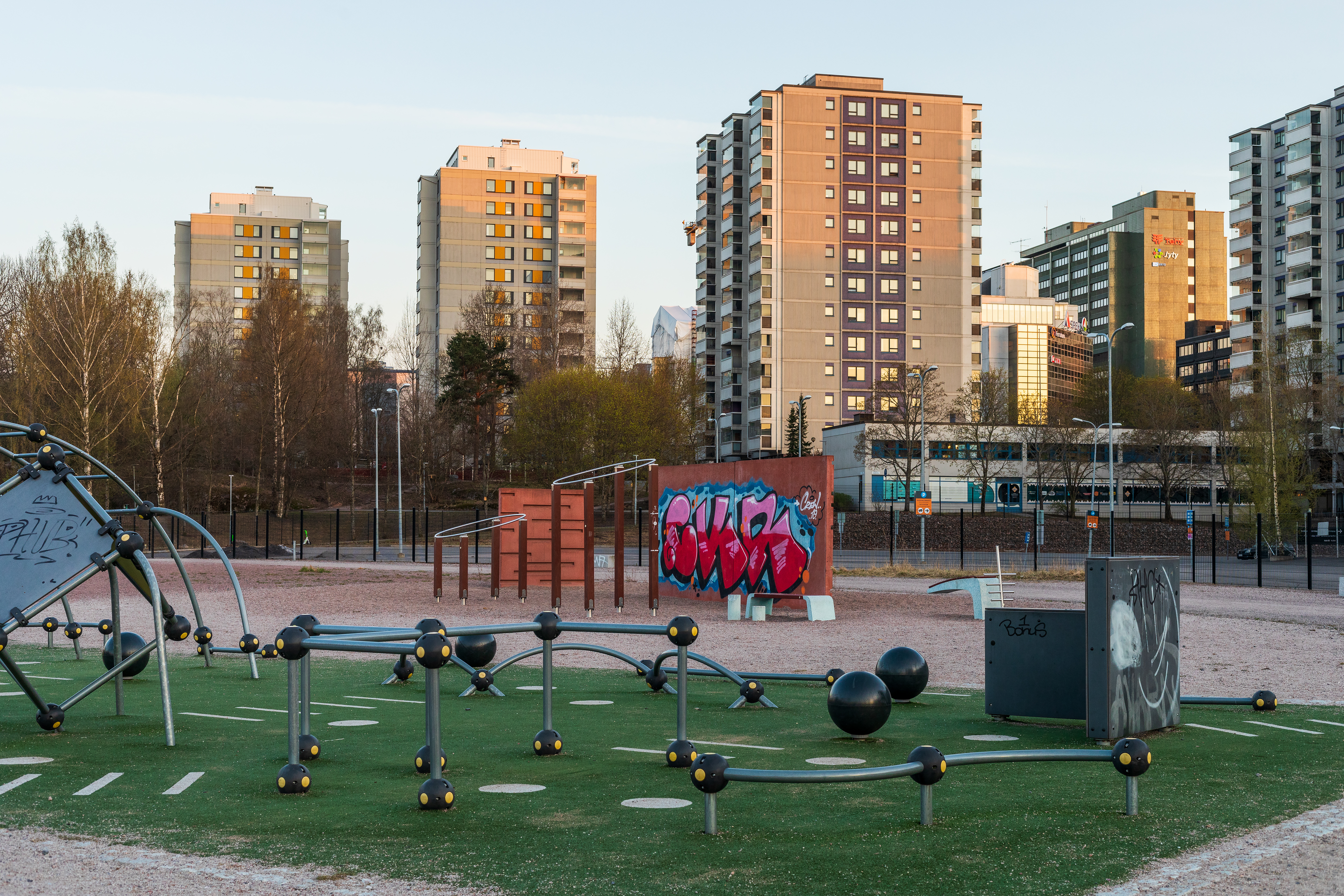
Playground at Käpylä sports park in Pasila, Helsinki, Finland

Playgrounds can be:

- Built with the collaborative support of corporate and community resources to achieve an immediate and visible improvement to the neighborhood.
- Public and free of charge, typically found at elementary schools
- Connected to a business and for customers only, such as those at McDonald's, IKEA, and Chuck E. Cheese's
- Commercial enterprises charging an entrance fee, such as Discovery Zone.
- Non-profit organizations for edutainment as children's museums and science centers; some charge admission, some are free.

=== Inclusive playgrounds ===
Universally designed playgrounds are created to be accessible to all children. There are three primary components to a higher level of inclusive play:

- physical accessibility;
- age and developmental appropriateness; and
- sensory-stimulating activity.

Some children with disabilities or developmental differences do not interact with playgrounds in the same way as typical children. A playground designed without considering these children's needs may not be accessible or enjoyable to them.

Most efforts at inclusive playgrounds have been aimed at accommodating wheelchair users. For example, rubber paths and ramps replace sand pits and steps, and some features are placed at ground level. Efforts to accommodate children on the autism spectrum, who may find playgrounds overstimulating or who may have difficulty interacting with other children, have been less common.

=== Natural playgrounds ===
"Natural playgrounds" are play environments that blend natural materials, features, and indigenous vegetation with creative landforms to create purposely complex interplays of natural and environmental objects that challenge and fascinate children and teach them about the wonders and intricacies of the natural world while they play within it.

Play components may include earth shapes (sculptures), environmental art, indigenous vegetation (trees, shrubs, grasses, flowers, lichens, mosses), boulders or other rock structures, dirt and sand, natural fences (stone, willow, wooden), textured pathways, and natural water features.

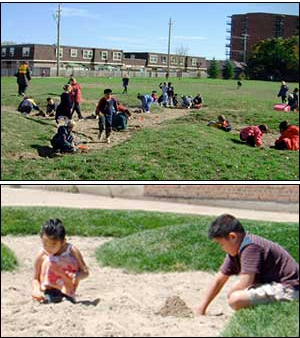
A natural playground sandbox provides a place for passive and creative play

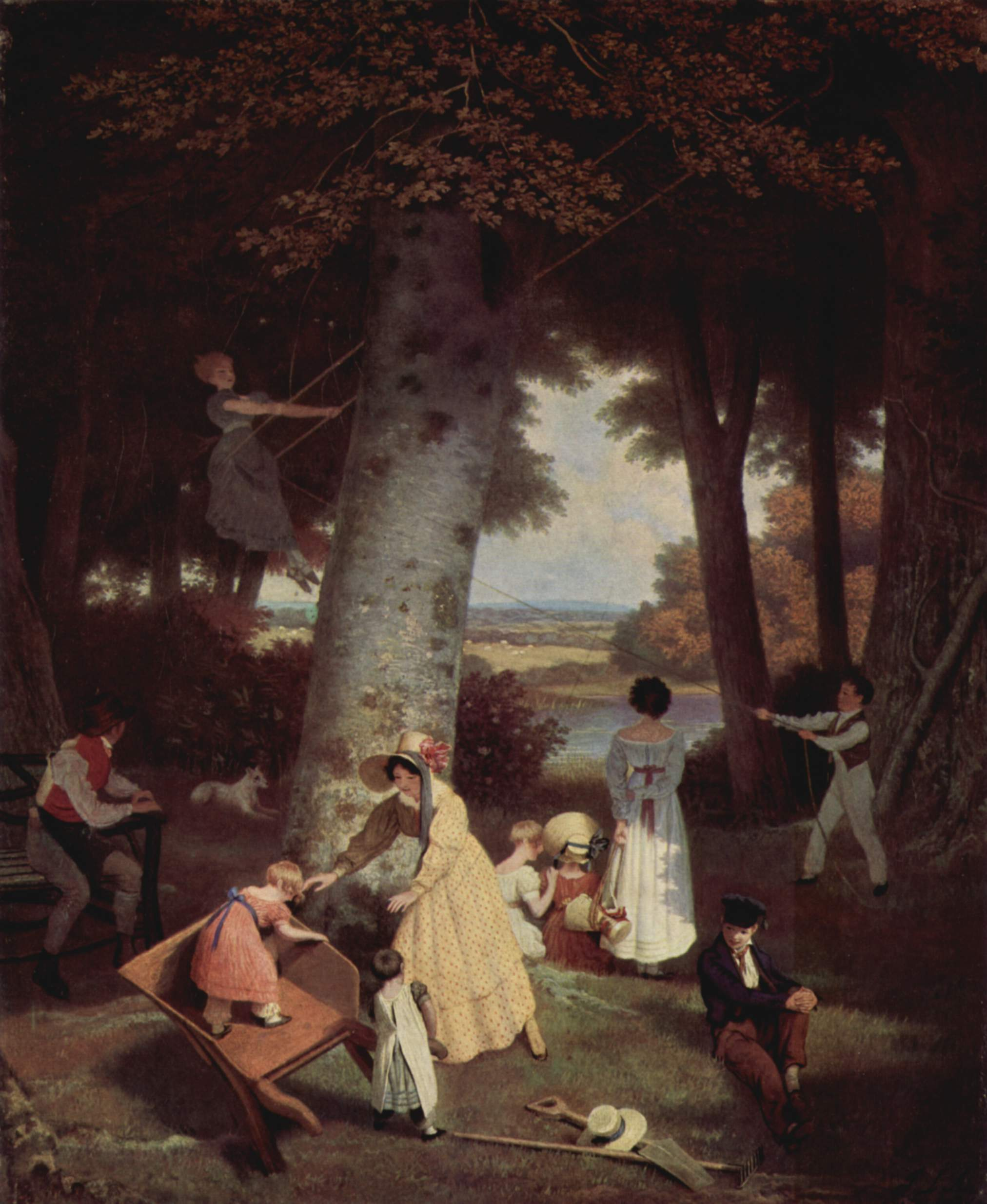
Jacques-Laurent Agasse: The Playground, 1830

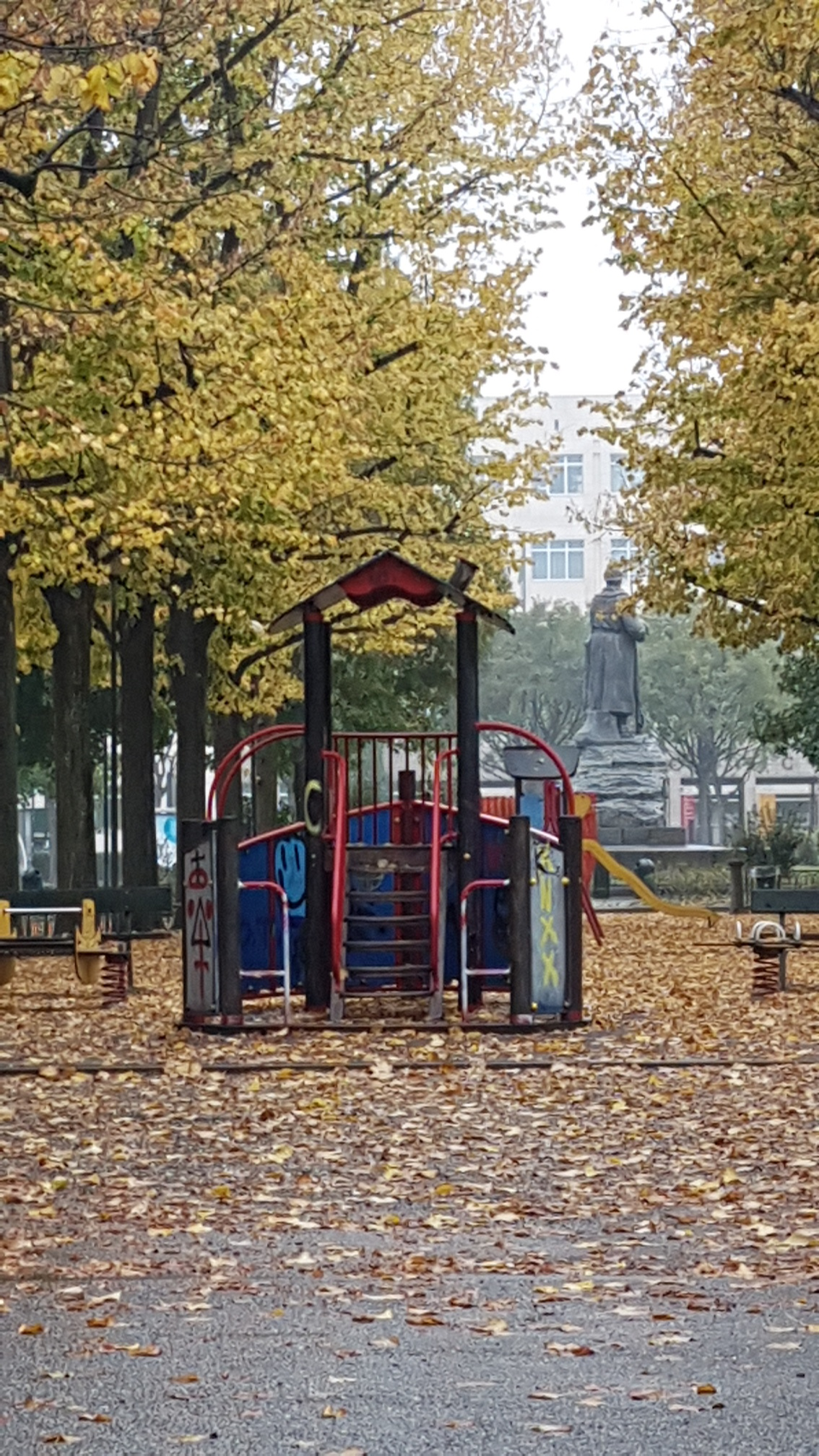
Playground in Turin, Italy on a rainy day in 2019

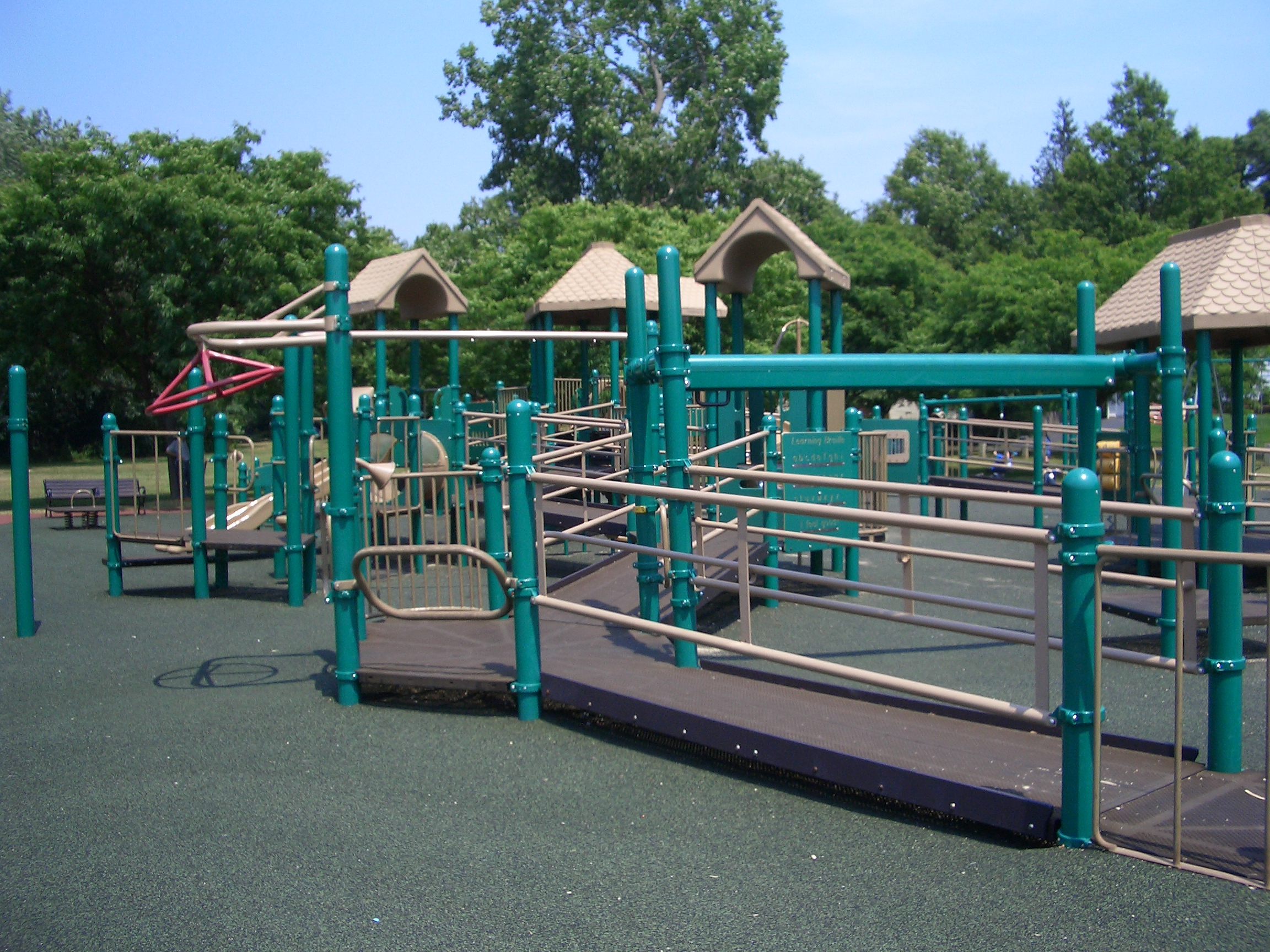
Wheelchair-accessible public playground in the US in 2007

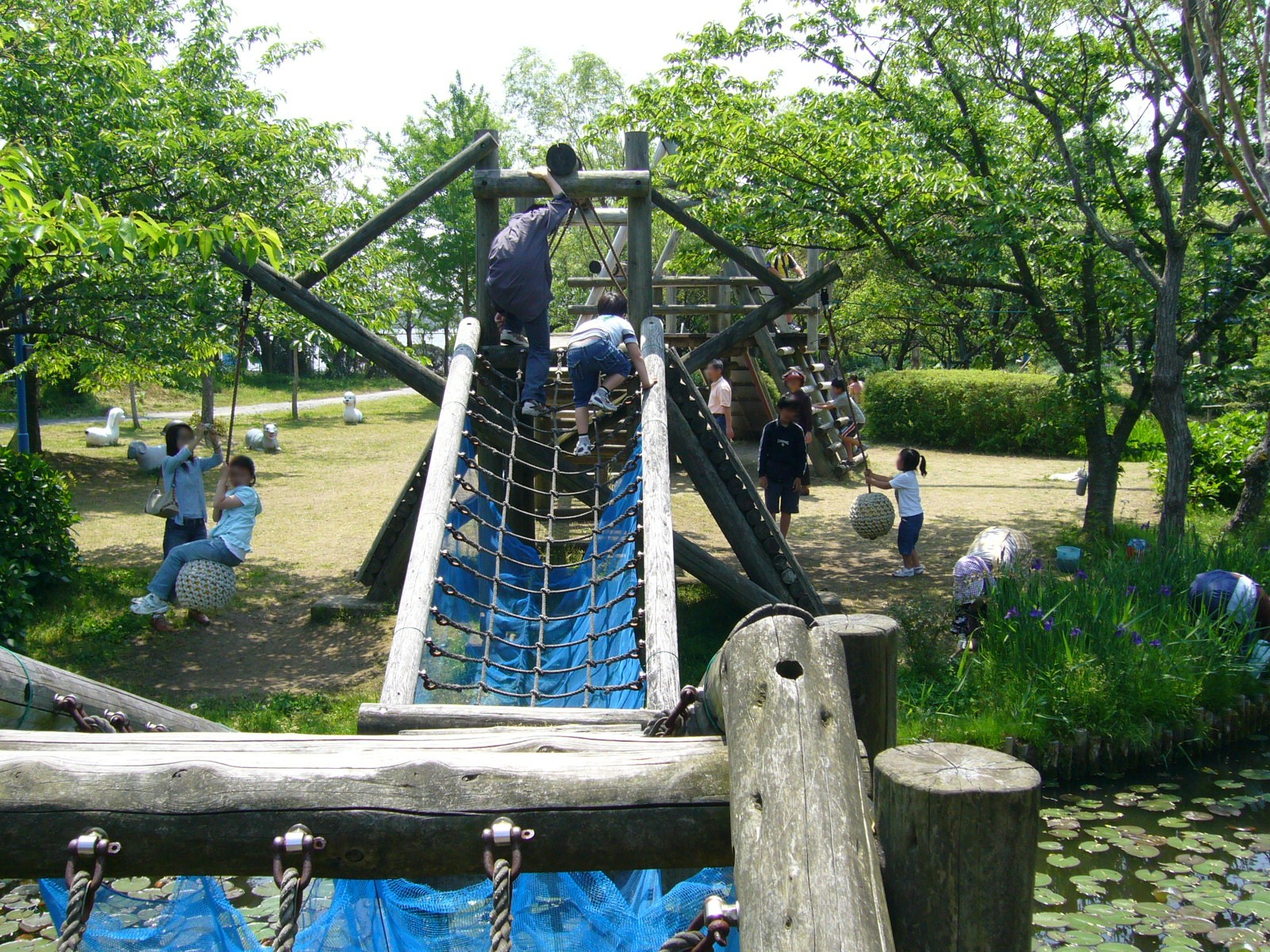
Playground incorporating aquatic plant life in Sawara, Japan

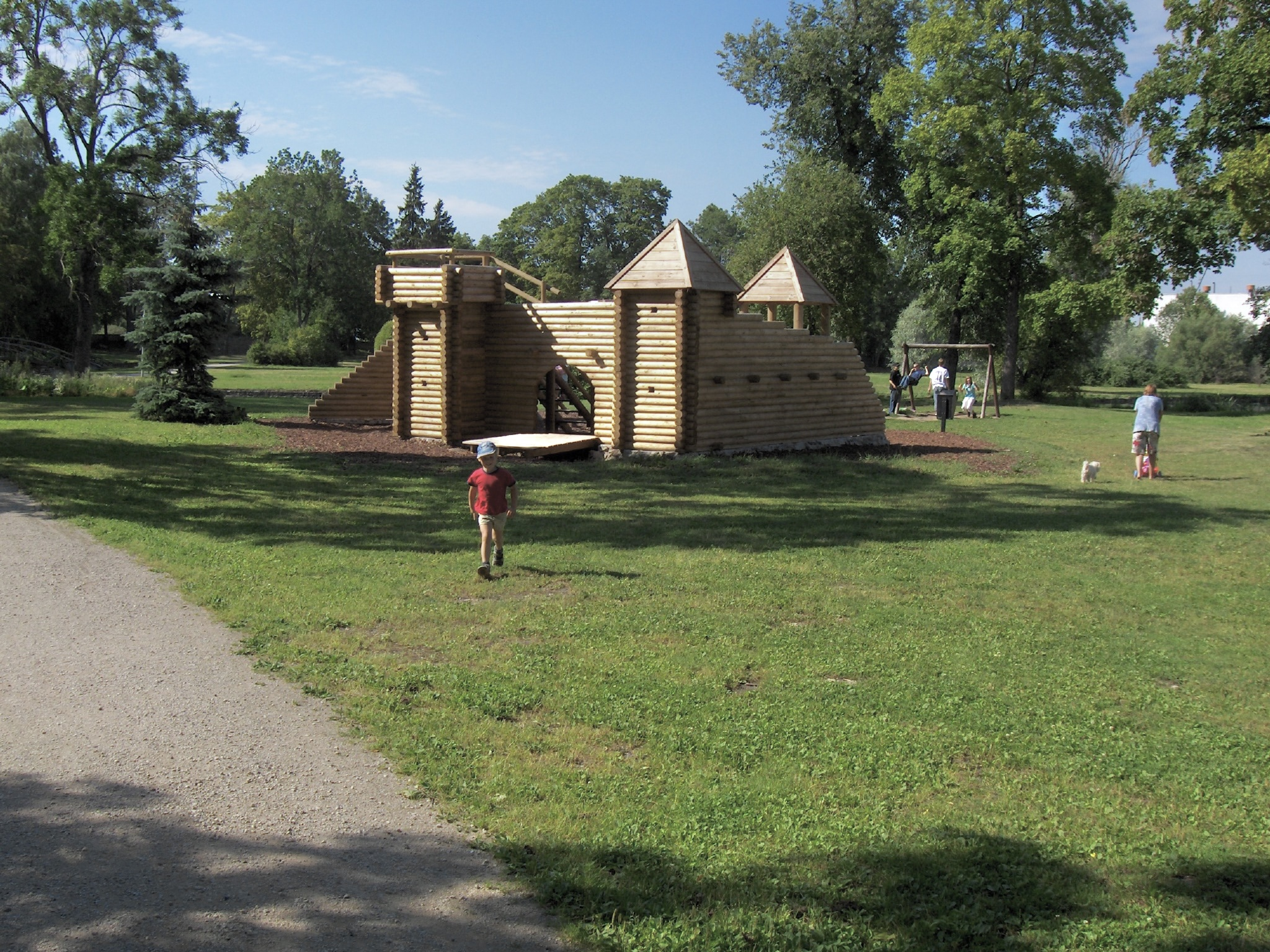
A wooden castle at playground in Rakvere, Estonia

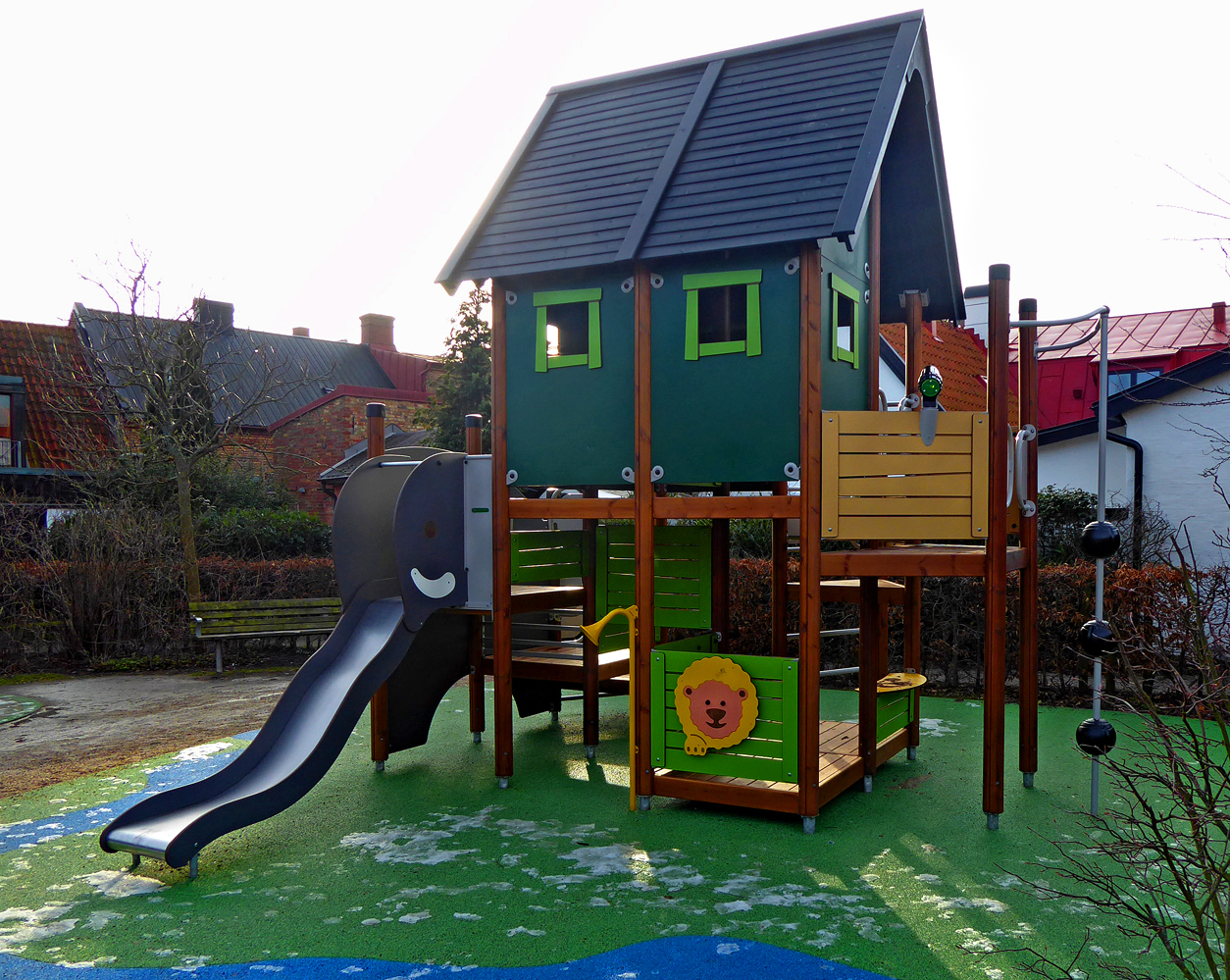
Playground in Ystad, Sweden in 2019. The colorful surface is soft rubber asphalt.

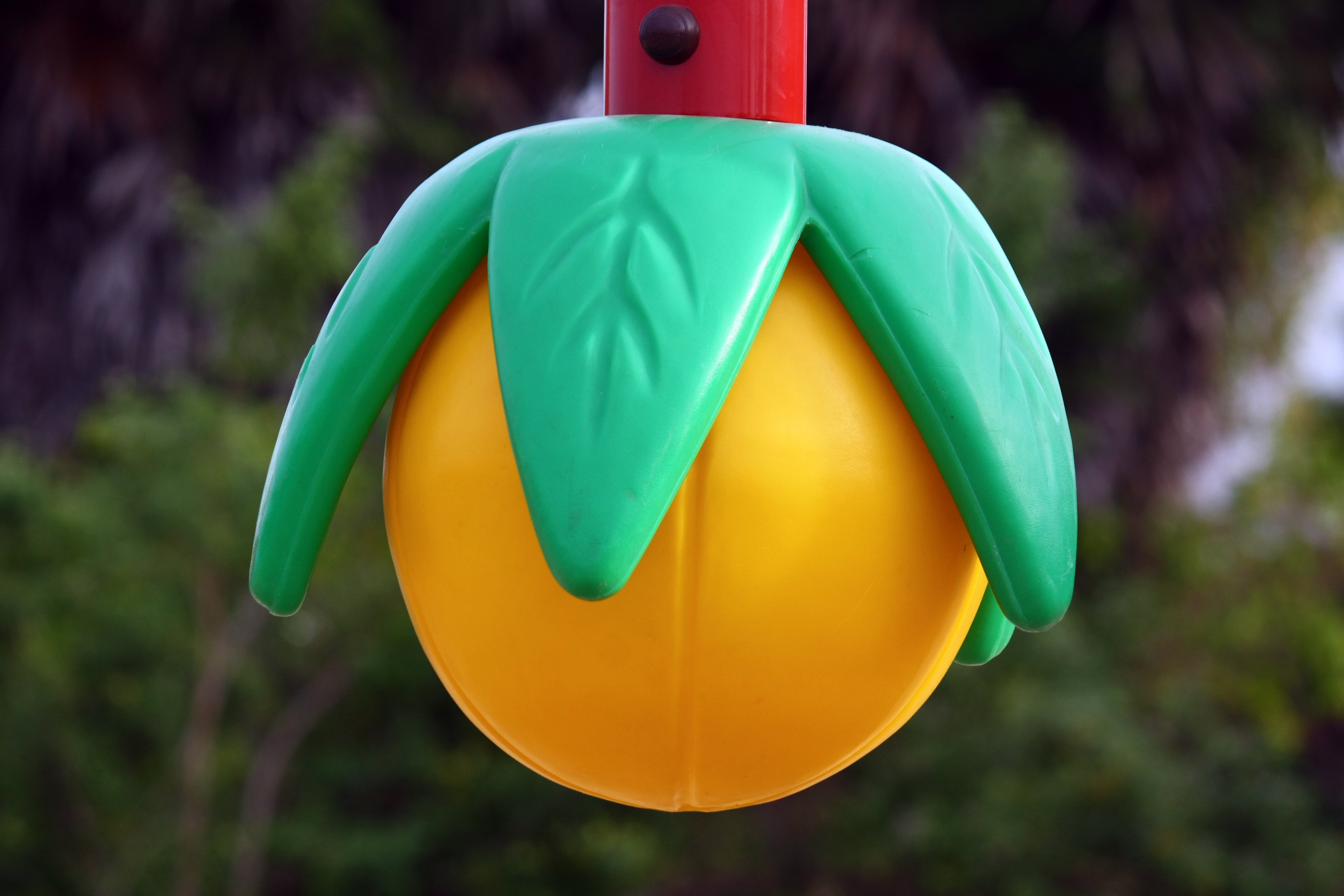
Hanging artificial fruit at a playground in Sri Lanka

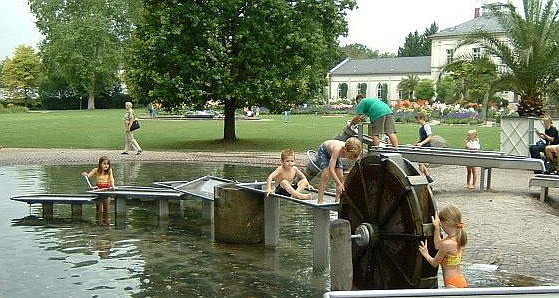
A water-based playground in Germany

=== Themed and educational playgrounds ===
Some playgrounds have specific purposes. A traffic park teaches children how to navigate streets safely. An adventure playground encourages open-ended play, sometimes involving potentially dangerous objects such as fire or hand tools. An obstacle course or ropes course is designed to focus participants' attention on accomplishing a predetermined challenging physical task. A trampoline park provides trampolines.

=== Playgrounds for adults ===
China and some European countries have playgrounds designed for adults. These are outdoor spaces that feature fitness equipment designed for use primarily by adults, such as chin-up bars.

Playgrounds for older adults are popular in China. Seniors are the primary users of public playgrounds in China. These playgrounds are usually in a smaller, screened area, which may reduce the feeling of being watched or judged by others. They often feature adult-sized equipment that helps seniors stretch, strengthen muscles, and improve their balance. Similar playgrounds for adults have been built in other countries. Berlin's Preußenpark, for example, is designed for people aged 70 or higher.

== See also ==
- Buddy bench
- Children Youth and Environments Journal
- Home zone/Play street
- Leathers and Associates
- Playground game
- Playground song
- Playground surfacing
- Recess (break)
