= Child savers =

The child-saving movement emerged in the United States during the nineteenth century and influenced the development of the juvenile justice system. Child savers stressed the value of redemption and prevention through early identification of deviance and intervention in the form of education and training.

Humanitarianism and altruism were not the only motivating factors for the child-savers. There are suggestions that an additional and perhaps overriding aim was to expand control over poor and immigrant children.

The child savers were 20th-century progressive era reformers whose intent was to mitigate the roots of child delinquency and to change the treatment of juveniles under the justice system. These women reformers organized in 1909 to stem the tide of 10,000 young offenders who passed annually through the city's court system. The greatest accomplishment of the child savers was the creation of the first juvenile court which appeared in Cook County, Illinois in 1899. This court was founded on two principles both highly advocated by the Child Savers. These two principles were formed on the basis that "juveniles were not ready to be held accountable for their actions" and "that they were not fully developed and could rehabilitate easier than adults". This issue of juvenile delinquency was a big issue between the 19th and the 20th centuries, therefore the contributions of the child savers, both good and bad are evident in their history. Also the establishment of juvenile courts in cities across the United States was one of the earliest social welfare reforms of the Progressive Era, and represented a major change in the way in which the law dealt with wayward children. The essence of the juvenile court idea, and of the juvenile court movement, is the recognition of the obligation of the great mother state to her neglected and errant children, and her obligation to deal with them as children and wards, rather than to class them as criminals and drive them by harsh measures into the ranks of vice and crime.

== Results of the child savers ==
The child savers received both positive and negative feedback for their activism. On the one hand they were heavily criticised for being too radical, while on the other they were praised for their revolutionary efforts. Nonetheless, the child savers brought about a new realization of humanism throughout this time period. Within Hull House that Jane Addams formed went forth with a commanding reform movement, thus defying middle class standards of appropriate behavior for women. America responded to the terrible ills of juvenile delinquency largely because of Jane Addams push to change their social justice. The Juvenile Protective Association, the first juvenile court in the United States, and a Juvenile Psychopathic Clinic. By the twenties, the leading edge of child protection had shifted from the Youth Justice Court to welfare agencies, and the JPA moved with it and now located on the North Side, the JPA continues to serve as a vital center of social work and advocacy on behalf of child and family welfare in Chicago.

== Positive outcomes ==
A major activist among the child savers was Jane Addams. She put forth many contributions from her work with the child savers including the first Hull House which was one of the first settlement houses as well as a woman's sociological institution. Another contribution is the invention of the Juvenile Protective Association (JPA). This institution was also established by Jane Addams which functions as a social welfare agency. Thus the understanding gained by the Hull House residents in acting as probation officers further persuaded that the existing system as regards children was inadequate and inconsistent. Followed by Jane Addams, Elizabeth Clapp established Chicago Woman's Club, in 1876 as traditional materialists. She describes their efforts as volunteer matrons in the city jail and police stations and as volunteer probation officers or social workers in court, their creation of a jail school and a charitable boarding school for neglected children. Clapp's work is valuable for demonstrating the formative, if informal, role women have played in advocacy for children.

== Negative effects ==
Although there were many positive outcomes to result from the child savers movement, there were also many misfortunes. Many scholars believe that the child savers promoted altruism and guidance but then others say: "the child savers should in no sense be considered libertarians or humanists". This is based on the research that the indiscriminate arrest, indeterminate sentencing, military drill, and hard labor were the concrete results of their reforms. Another problem was that the child savers tried to promote liberating the 'delinquent' children from the capitalism movement that wished to stem the "militant" wave through a new political economy, which resulted in tighter supervision and control from adults. According to Anthony Platt, the child-saving movement came from the upper and middle classes who were instrumental in incorporating new methods of social control on a largely immigrant class—the immigrant class was seen as inferior to the typical Protestant white ethic that comprised most of the US.

== Bibliography ==
- "Child or Adult? a Century Long View". PBS Frontline. PBS. 29 March 2008.
- Hefner, Keith. "The Child Savers." Prohosting. FPS. 29 March 2008.
- Krisberg, Barry, and James F. Austin. Reinventing Juvenile Justice. Newbury Park: Sage Publications, 1993.
- Platt, Anthony M. The Child Savers; the Invention of Delinquency,. Chicago: University of Chicago, 1969.
- Roach Anleu, S (1995) Lifting the lid: Perspectives on social control, youth crime and juvenile justice. In Simpson, C & Hill, R eds, Ways of Resistance: Social Control and young people in Australia. Hale and Iremonger, Sydney, pp. 22–45.
- Platt, Anthony M. The Child Savers: The Invention of Delinquency. Michigan Law Review, Vol. 68, No. 4 (Mar. 1970)
- Platt, Anthony M. "Child Savers." University of Chicago Press, Chicago. Second Edition 1977.
- Clapp J. Elizabeth. Mother of all Children: Women Reformers and the Rise of Juvenile Courts in Progressive Era America, The Historical Review, Vol 105, No. 1
- Clapp J. Elizabeth. The Chicago Juvenile Court Movement.
- Willrich, Michael. City of Courts: Socializing Justice in Progressive Era Chicago. 2003.
