= Anthony Platt =

British sociologist and criminologist (born 1942)

Anthony Michael Platt (born 1942) is an English-born sociologist and criminologist. He is a Distinguished Affiliated Scholar at Berkeley’s Center for the Study of Law and Society. He is Professor Emeritus at Sacramento State School of Social Work. Platt is a notable scholar in the domains of child welfare and deviance.

== Early life and education ==
Platt was born in Manchester, England in 1942. He then attended the University of Oxford and acquired a degree in law and jurisprudence. He received his masters and PhD in criminology in 1965 and 1996 respectively from University of California, Berkeley. Platt completed a postdoctoral fellowship with the University of Chicago. Then he returned to the University of California, Berkeley in 1968 as an Assistant Professor. He then became a part of the radical criminology movement in criminal justice studies.

== Selected books ==
- Platt, Tony. The Scandal of Cal: Land Grabs, White Supremacy, and Miseducation at UC Berkeley. Heyday Books, 2023.
- Platt Tony. Grave Matters: The Controversy over Excavating California’s Buried Indigenous Past. Berkeley, California, Heyday, 2021.
- Platt, Tony. Beyond These Walls: Rethinking Crime and Punishment in the United States. New York, St. Martin’s Press, 2019.
- Platt, Tony, and Cecilia Elizabeth O’Leary. Bloodlines: Recovering Hitler’s Nuremberg Laws, from Patton’s Trophy to Public Memorial. London, Routledge, 2016.
- Platt, Tony. Grave Matters : Excavating California’s Buried Past. Heyday, 2011.
- Platt, Anthony M. E. Franklin Frazier Reconsidered. Rutgers University Press, 1991.
- Platt, Anthony M. The Politics of Riot Commissions, 1917-1970. Collier Books, 1971.
- Platt, Anthony M, and Miroslava Chavez-Garcia. The Child Savers: The Invention of Delinquency. New Brunswick, N.J., Rutgers University Press, 2009, originally published in 1969.
