= GRI =

GRI or Gri may refer to:

== Companies and organizations ==
- Gas Research Institute
- Geoscience Research Institute, of the Seventh-day Adventist Church
- Getty Research Institute, in Los Angeles, California
- Glasgow Royal Infirmary, a Scottish teaching hospital
- Global Reporting Initiative, an international standards organization
- Global Risk Institute, a Canadian think tank
- Grainger plc, a British residential property firm
- GrassRoots Interactive, an American lobbying firm
- Gypsum Recycling International, a Danish recycling firm

== Transportation ==
- Central Nebraska Regional Airport
- Grand Island Army Air Field, operating 1942 to 1946
- Green River (Amtrak station), in Utah

== Other ==
- General Rate Increase applicable to costs of container ship freight carriage
- General Rules for the Interpretation of the Harmonized System, rules about the classification of goods
- Global Retirement Index, an attempt to examine the factors that drive retirement security
- Global Rights Index, an assessment of trade unions and human rights by country
- Ghari language, spoken on Guadalcanal in the Solomon Islands
- GABA reuptake inhibitor, a drug
- Glycine reuptake inhibitor, a type of drug which inhibits the reuptake of the neurotransmitter glycine
- Gri graphical language, a programming language

== See also ==
- Georgius Rex Imperator (disambiguation)
