= Gris (disambiguation) =

Gris is a video game.

Gris may also refer to:

== People ==
- Gris Davies-Scourfield, (1918–2006), British Army officer and Colditz escapee
- Gris Grimly, the pen name of Steven Soenksen (born 1975), American artist and storyteller
- Le Gris, 18th-century chief of the Pepikokia band of the Miami tribe
- Jacques Le Gris (c. 1330–1386), French squire and knight
- Jean Antoine Arthur Gris (1829–1872), French botanist
- Juan Gris (1887–1927), Spanish painter

== Other uses ==
- Gamma-Ray Imaging Spectrometer
- Greenland ice sheet
- "Gris", a song by Ximena Sariñana from Mediocre, 2008
- "Gris", a song by J Balvin from Colores, 2020
- "Gris", a song by Juanes from Vida Cotidiana, 2023
- The Danish, Norwegian and Swedish word for pig
- The French and Spanish word for gray

== See also ==
- GRI (disambiguation)
- Gris gris (disambiguation)
