= Gypsum recycling =

Gypsum recycling is the process of turning gypsum waste (from construction) into recycled gypsum, thereby generating a raw material that can replace virgin gypsum raw materials in the manufacturing of new products.

== Gypsum waste definition and types ==
Gypsum waste primarily consists of waste from gypsum boards, which are wall or ceiling panels made of a gypsum core between paper lining. Such boards are also referred to as sheetrock, plasterboards, drywall, wallboards and gyprock. Gypsum waste in some countries also consists of gypsum blocks and plaster, among others.

Three main types of gypsum waste based on their origin can be distinguished:

Gypsum waste from the manufacturing of gypsum products.
This waste, which arises at the industrial gypsum production sites, consists of rejects and non-spec materials generated during the manufacturing of gypsum products. The recycling of this waste stream is usually part of the waste avoidance activity of the gypsum plants. The waste is referred to as gypsum manufacturing or production waste and the recycled gypsum obtained from the recycling of this is known as “production waste derived recycled gypsum”.
Gypsum waste from new construction.
Gypsum waste from new construction activities is typically a clean waste, and primarily consists of off-cuts of plasterboard (drywall, wallboard or gyprock) when the boards have been cut to fit the dimensions of the wall or ceiling. The waste may constitute 15% of the gypsum materials used on the site. Such waste is generally referred to as new construction gypsum waste, and can be reduced by ordering boards “made-to-measure”, but in most markets less than 10% of all orders are “made-to-measure”.
Gypsum waste from demolition and reconstruction
This waste arises when already installed plasterboards (drywalls, wallboards or gyprock boards), that usually have been installed many years ago, are taken out in connection with that the building is demolished or renovated. For this reason some refer to this waste as “old gypsum waste”, whereas the trade usually refer to this waste as “demolition waste”. Different from the two other types of gypsum waste described above, this type of gypsum waste from renovation, refurbishment and demolition works is more likely to present a certain degree of contamination, which can be in the form of nails, screws, wood, insulation, wall coverings etc. For this waste to be recyclable it is required that the equipment processing the waste is capable of separating such contamination from the gypsum to arrive at a pure recycled gypsum. New construction and demolition gypsum waste are both generated after the gypsum products have left the manufacturer, and together these two waste types are referred to as post consumer gypsum waste.

== Gypsum recycling process ==
Gypsum waste can be turned into recycled gypsum by processing the gypsum waste in such a way that the contaminants are removed and the paper facing of the plasterboard is separated from the gypsum core through mechanical processes including grinding and sieving in specialised equipment. Gypsum waste such as gypsum blocks and plaster do not require the removal of paper, as they are not made with paper from the beginning. It is typical for the gypsum recyclers to accept up to 3 per cent of contamination from other materials. The professional recyclers are capable of handling gypsum waste with nails and screws, wall coverings etc.

== Why should gypsum waste be recycled? ==
Gypsum materials consist of calcium sulfate dihydrate (CaSO_{4}·2H_{2}O). Sulfate-reducing bacteria convert sulfates to toxic hydrogen sulphide gas; they are killed by exposure to air, but the moist, airless, carbon-containing environment in a landfill is a good habitat for them. So gypsum put into landfill will decompose, releasing up to a quarter of its weight in hydrogen sulfide. Moreover, methanogenic bacteria also thrive in such an environment, and convert the paper in the plasterboard to methane gas which is a potent greenhouse gas.

Recycling gypsum waste also reduces the need for the quarrying and production of virgin gypsum raw materials.

Recycling one ton of the ordinary gypsum will save 1,000 pounds of black alkali, 1 ton of lactic acid and 500 kwh of energy.

Recycling one metric ton of gypsum will save 28 kwh of energy and 4 pounds of aluminium.

== Rationale for choosing closed loop recycling ==
Gypsum is fully and eternally recyclable and, as a consequence, gypsum waste is one of the few construction materials for which closed loop recycling is possible.

Closed loop recycling of gypsum products involves the collection and processing of the gypsum waste, and the delivery of the obtained recycled gypsum to the manufacturer of gypsum products. It is therefore essential that the recycled gypsum achieves a pre-determined quality suitable for the manufacturing of new gypsum products. Presently there is no European or American standard pre-determining the recycled gypsum's quality and the criteria vary from plant to plant.

By choosing closed loop recycling the need for manufacturers to acquire virgin gypsum is reduced, contributing therefore to promote a sustainable manufacturing process.

The most advanced plants, and most of these are found in the Nordic countries in Europe, have substituted up to 30 per cent of virgin gypsum raw materials with recycled gypsum.

== Gypsum recycling in Europe ==
Gypsum recycling in Europe was started by the Danish company Gypsum Recycling International A/S^{[usurped]} in Denmark, in 2001. After a few years the recycling system received waste from approximately 85 per cent of all public civic amenity/recycling centres and a recycling rate of 60 per cent of all gypsum waste was achieved. The system has been exported to cover other European countries. Today also new recyclers have emerged and gypsum recycling systems have been introduced in more countries, like the UK, France and in the Benelux, but the highest recycling rates for gypsum waste are still found in Denmark, Norway and Sweden. January 1, 2013 the European Life + project “Gypsum to Gypsum” started, with the overall aim of transforming the gypsum demolition waste market to achieve higher recycling rates of gypsum waste, thereby helping to achieve a resource efficient economy. One of the drivers for the project is the target set by the European Union to achieve that 70 per cent of construction and demolition waste is recycled by 2020.

== Gypsum recycling in North America ==
Urban Gypsum Recycling Urban Gypsum is a division of Laneco, Inc. and provides gypsum wallboard recycling services for the Pacific Northwest of the United States. This recovered gypsum is then distributed to agricultural and industrial customers in the region keeping the wallboard from ending up in the landfill.

New West Gypsum Recycling began recycling of wallboard waste in Canada in 1985. The recycled material is a blend of pre- and post-consumer, wet and dry gypsum waste that is a source of raw material for use in the manufacture of new drywall products. Gypsum Agri-cycle is one of the first companies to recycle drywall in the USA. Gypsum Agri-cycle is another North American recycler of new construction drywall located in Pennsylvania. Pennsylvania does not allow Gypsum Agri-cycle to recycle demolition drywall.

Zanker Recycling began recycling gypsum in the form of sheetrock in 1999. In the recycling process, materials such as wood, metals, and trash are removed on-site where a dozer is used to crush the materials.

American Gypsum Recycling American Gypsum Recycling was founded in 2018 by Chris Stapleton. His vision for the company is to transform the Northwest drywall waste stream into a valuable product for agriculture and industry.

USA Gypsum located in Denver, PA provides both closed loop recycling and up-cycling reclaimed gypsum to higher value gypsum products such as agricultural gypsum.

== See also ==
- Recycling by product
- Henrik Lund-Nielsen
- Gypsum Recycling International
