= Recycling by product =

Recycling methods by type of product

Products made from a variety of materials can be recycled using a number of processes.

== Building and construction waste ==
=== Aggregates and concrete ===
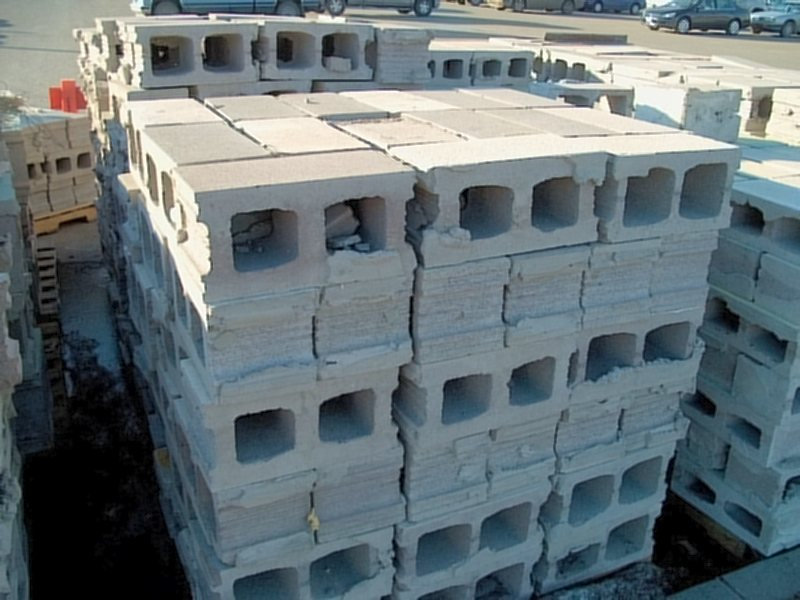
Concrete blocks in Germany.

Concrete aggregate collected from demolition sites is put through a crushing machine, often along with asphalt, bricks, dirt, and rocks. Smaller pieces of concrete are used as gravel for new construction projects. Crushed recycled concrete can also be used as the dry aggregate for new concrete if it is free of contaminants. Builder's rubble (like broken down bricks) is also used for railway ballast and gravel paths. This reduces the need for other rocks to be dug up, which in turn saves trees and habitats.

=== Asphalt and tarmac ===
Asphalt including asphalt shingle can be melted down and in part recycled. Tarmac can also be recycled and there is now an active market for recycling tarmac in the developed world. This includes tarmac scalpings produced when roads are scarified before a new surface is laid.

=== Gypsum, plaster and plasterboard products ===
Because up to 17% of gypsum products are wasted during the manufacturing and installation processes. Wallboard (Australia and others), plasterboard, Gyp (New Zealand), drywall (USA) or plasterboard (UK and Ireland) is frequently not re-used and disposal can become a problem. Some landfill sites have banned dumping of gypsum because of the tendency to produce large volumes of hydrogen sulfide gas. Some manufacturers take back waste wallboards from construction sites and recycle it into new wallboard. Gypsum waste from new construction, demolition and refurbishment activities can be turned into recycled gypsum through mechanical processes, and the recycled gypsum obtained can replace virgin gypsum in the Gypsum Industry. Some of the reasons for recycling this waste are:

- Gypsum is one of the few construction materials for which closed loop recycling is possible.
- Closed loop gypsum recycling saves virgin gypsum resources.
- According to the European Directive 2008/98/EC on Waste, recycling should be preferred to recovery and landfill disposal.
- This Directive also establishes that the preparing for re-use, recycling and other material recovery of non-hazardous Construction and Demolition (C&D) waste (excluding soil and stones other that those containing dangerous substances) have to be increased to a minimum of 70% by weight by 2020.
- The disposal of gypsum-based materials can become a problem if they are accepted at normal cells in non-hazardous landfills, as the sulphate content of gypsum mixed with organic waste can break down under certain conditions into hydrogen sulfide gas.

=== Bricks ===
Intact bricks recovered from demolition can be cleaned and re-used.

== Batteries ==
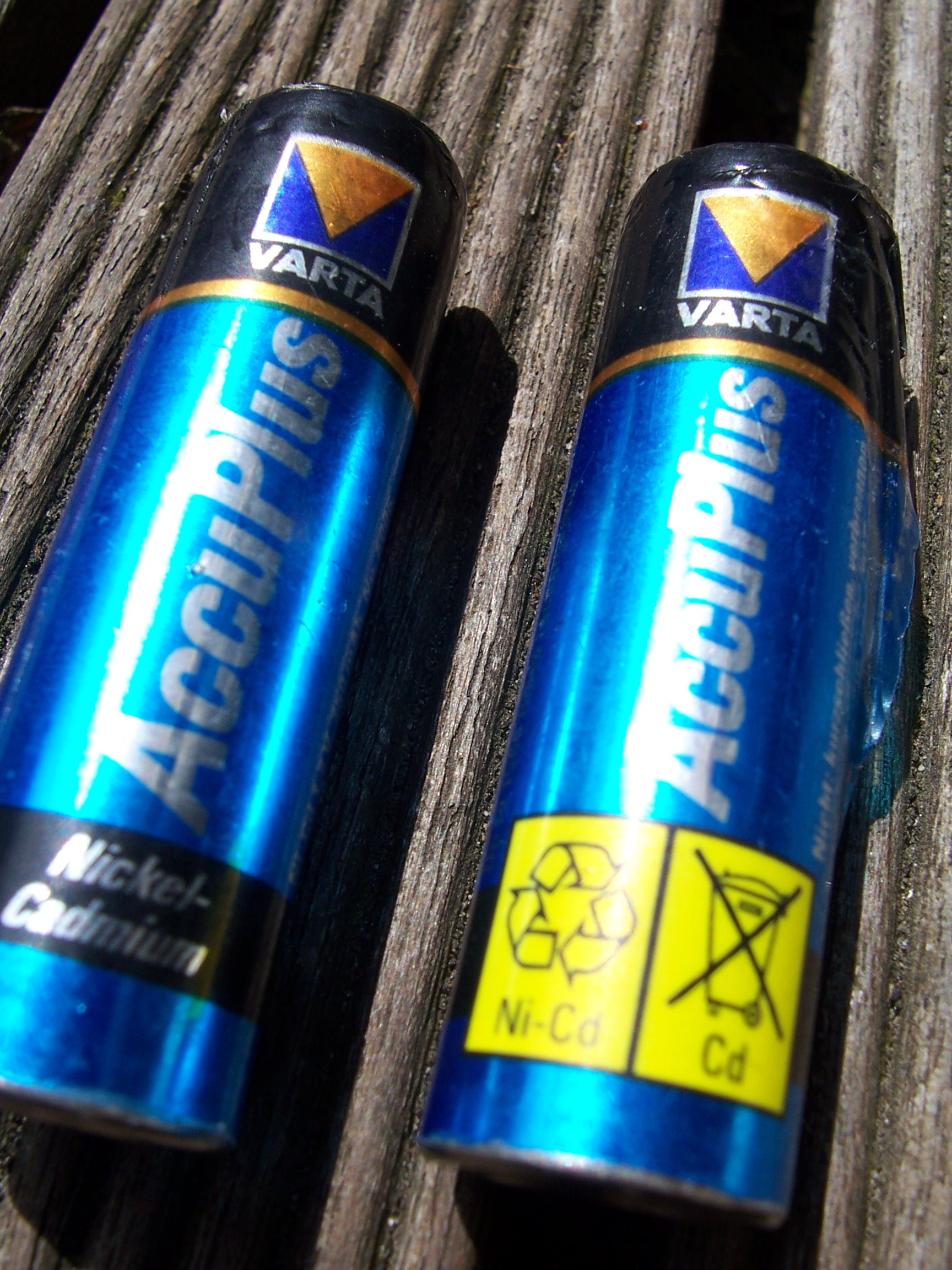
Some batteries contain toxic heavy metals, making recycling or proper disposal a high priority. These batteries are Dutch; the Netherlands openly encourages battery recycling.

The large variation in size and type of batteries makes their recycling extremely difficult: they must first be sorted into similar kinds and each kind requires an individual recycling process. Additionally, older batteries contain mercury and cadmium, harmful materials that must be handled with care. Because of their potential environmental damage, proper disposal of used batteries is required by law in many areas. Unfortunately, this mandate has been difficult to enforce.

Lead-acid batteries, like those used in automobiles, are relatively easy to recycle and many regions have legislation requiring vendors to accept used products. In the United States, the recycling rate is 90%, with new batteries containing up to 80% recycled material.

Japan, Kuwait, the USA, Canada, France, the Netherlands, Germany, Austria, Belgium, Sweden, the UK and Ireland all actively encourage battery recycling programs. In 2006, the EU passed the Battery Directive of which one of the aims is a higher rate of battery recycling. The EU directive said at least 25% of all the EU's used batteries must be collected by 2012, and rising to no less than 45% by 2016, of which, that at least 50% of them must be recycled.

== Biodegradable waste ==
Kitchen, garden, and other green waste can be recycled into useful material by composting into leaf mold and regular compost. This process allows natural aerobic bacteria to break down the waste into fertile topsoil. Much composting is done on a household scale, but municipal green-waste collection programs also exist. These programs can supplement their funding by selling the topsoil produced.

== Electronic waste ==
=== Electronics disassembly and reclamation ===
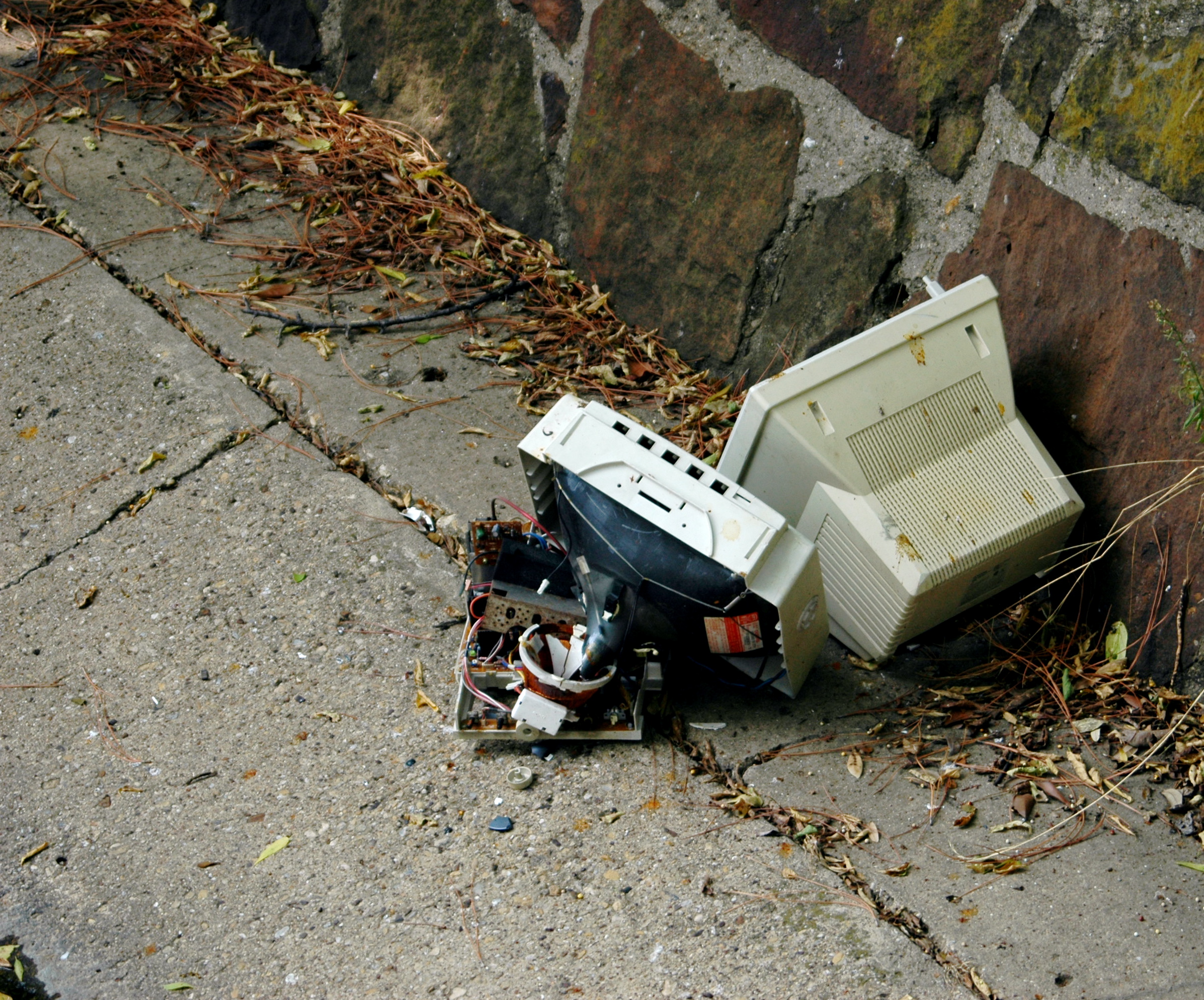
An abandoned computer monitor in Denton, Texas.

Electronic recycling is recycling or reuse of computers or other electronics. It includes both finding another use for materials (such as donation to charity), and having systems dismantled in a manner that allows for the safe extraction of the constituent materials for reuse in other products. The direct disposal of electrical equipment—such as old computers and mobile phones is banned in many areas, such as the UK, parts of the USA, Japan, Ireland, Germany and the Netherlands, due to the toxic contents of certain components. The recycling process works by mechanically separating the metals, plastics, and circuit boards contained in the appliance. When this is done on a large scale at an electronic waste recycling plant, component recovery can be achieved cost-effectively.

With high lead content in CRTs, and the rapid diffusion of new flat-panel display technologies, some of which (LCDs) use lamps containing mercury, there is growing concern about electronic waste from discarded televisions. Related occupational health concerns exist, as well, for disassemblers and scrap dealers removing copper wiring and other materials from CRTs. Further environmental concerns related to television design and use relate to the devices' increasing electrical energy requirements.

Computers that are termed trashware in North America or totally reconditioned hardware in the UK and Ireland are computer equipment that has assembled from old hardware, using cleaned and checked parts from different computers, for use by disadvantaged people to bridge the digital divide. Trashware is different from retrocomputing, which has only cultural and recreational purposes.

=== Ink jet printer cartridges ===
Resetting an Epson ink cartridge using a resetter tool.

Because printer cartridges from the original manufacturer are often expensive, demand exists for cheaper third party options. These include ink sold in bulk, cartridge refill kits, machines in stores that automatically refill cartridges, re-manufactured cartridges, and cartridges made by a corporate entity other than the original manufacturer.

Consumers can refill ink cartridges themselves with a kit, or they can take the cartridge to a refilled or re-manufacturer where ink is pumped back into the cartridge. PC World reports that refilled cartridges have higher failure rates, print fewer pages than new cartridges, and demonstrate more on-page problems like streaking, curling, and colour bleed.

== Metals ==
A wide range of metals in commercial and domestic use have well-developed recycling markets in most developed countries. Domestic recycling is commonly available for Iron and steel, aluminium and in particular beverage and food cans. In addition, building metals such as copper, zinc and lead are readily recyclable through specialised companies. In the UK, these are usually either specialised scrap dealers or car breakers. Other metals present in smaller quantities in the domestic waste stream such as tin and chromium are also extracted from metal put into the recycling system but are rarely recovered from the general waste stream.

== Paint ==
Paint is a recyclable item. Latex paint is collected at collection facilities in many countries and shipped to paint-recycling facilities.

== Paper and newsprint ==
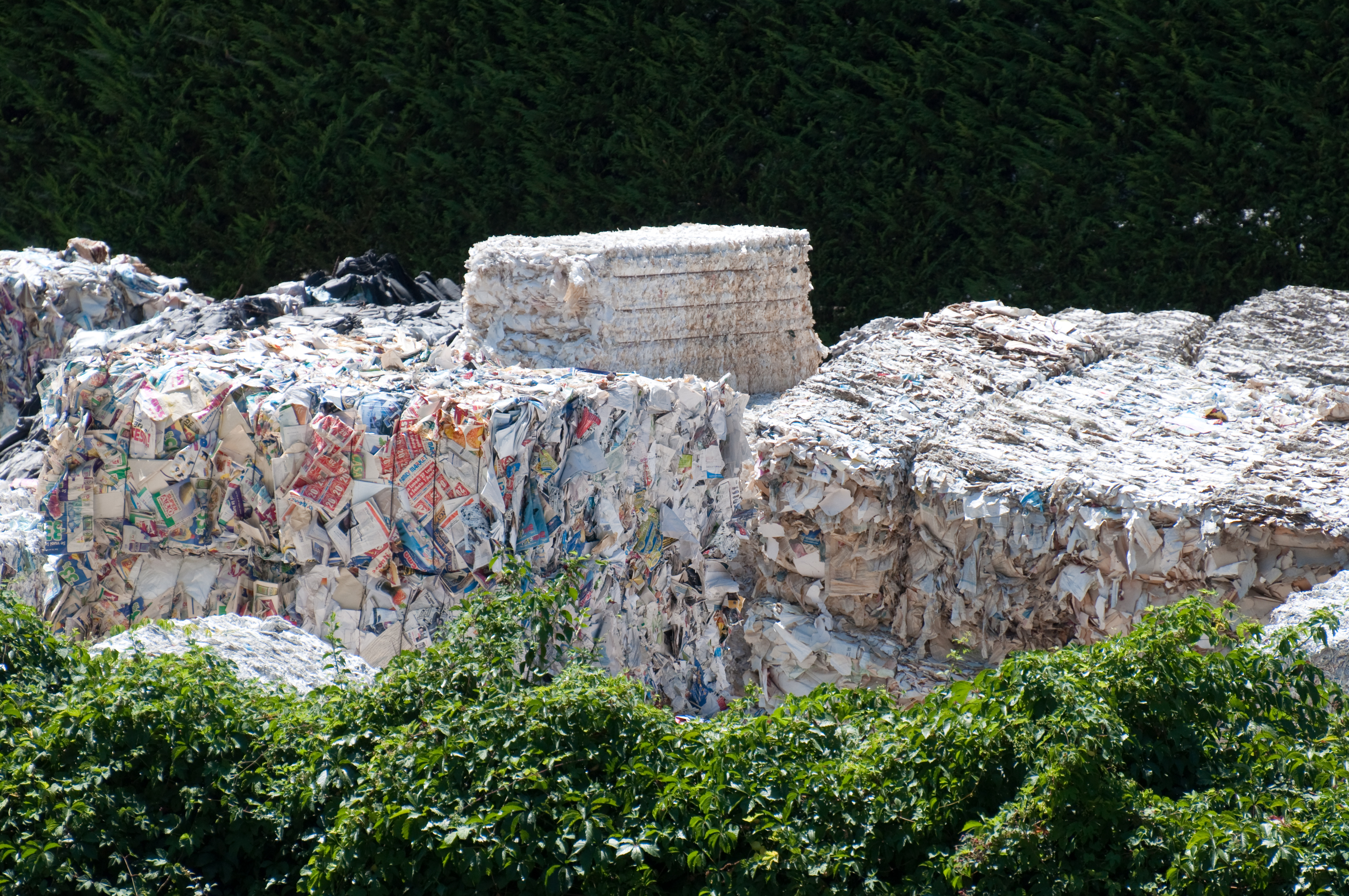
Waste paper collected for recycling in Ponte a Serraglio, near Bagni di Lucca, Italy.

Paper and newsprint can be recycled by reducing it to pulp and combining it with pulp from newly harvested wood. As the recycling process causes the paper fibres to break down, each time paper is recycled its quality decreases. This means that either a higher percentage of new fibres must be added, or the paper down-cycled into lower quality products. Any writing or colouration of the paper must first be removed by deinking, which also removes fillers, clays, and fibre fragments.

Almost all paper can be recycled today, but some types are harder to recycle than others. Papers coated with plastic or aluminium foil, and papers that are waxed, pasted, or gummed are usually not recycled because the process is too expensive.

Sometimes recyclers ask for the removal of the glossy paper inserts from newspapers because they are a different type of paper. Glossy inserts have a heavy clay coating that some paper mills cannot accept. Most of the clay is removed from the recycled pulp as sludge, which must be disposed of. If the coated paper is 20% by weight clay, then each ton of glossy paper produces more than 200 kg of sludge and less than 800 kg of fibre.

The price of recycled paper has varied greatly over the last 30 or so years. The German price of €100/£49 per tonne was typical for the year 2003 and it steadily rose over the years. By the September 2008 saw the American price of $235 per ton, which had fallen to just $120 per ton, and in the January 2009, the UK's fell six weeks from about £70.00 per ton, to only £10.00 per ton. The slump was probably due to the economic down turn in East Asia leading to market for waste paper drying up in China. 2010 averaged at $120.32 over the start of the year, but saw a rapid rise global prices in May 2010, with the June 2010 resting $217.11 per ton in the USA as China's paper market began to reopen!

Mexico, America, the EU, Russia and Japan all recycle paper en masse and there are many state run and private schemes running in those countries. In 2004 the paper recycling rate in Europe was 54.6% or 45.5 million short tons (41.3 Mt). The recycling rate in Europe reached 64.5%3 in 2007, which confirms that the industry is on the path to meeting its voluntary target of 66% by 2010.

== Plastic ==
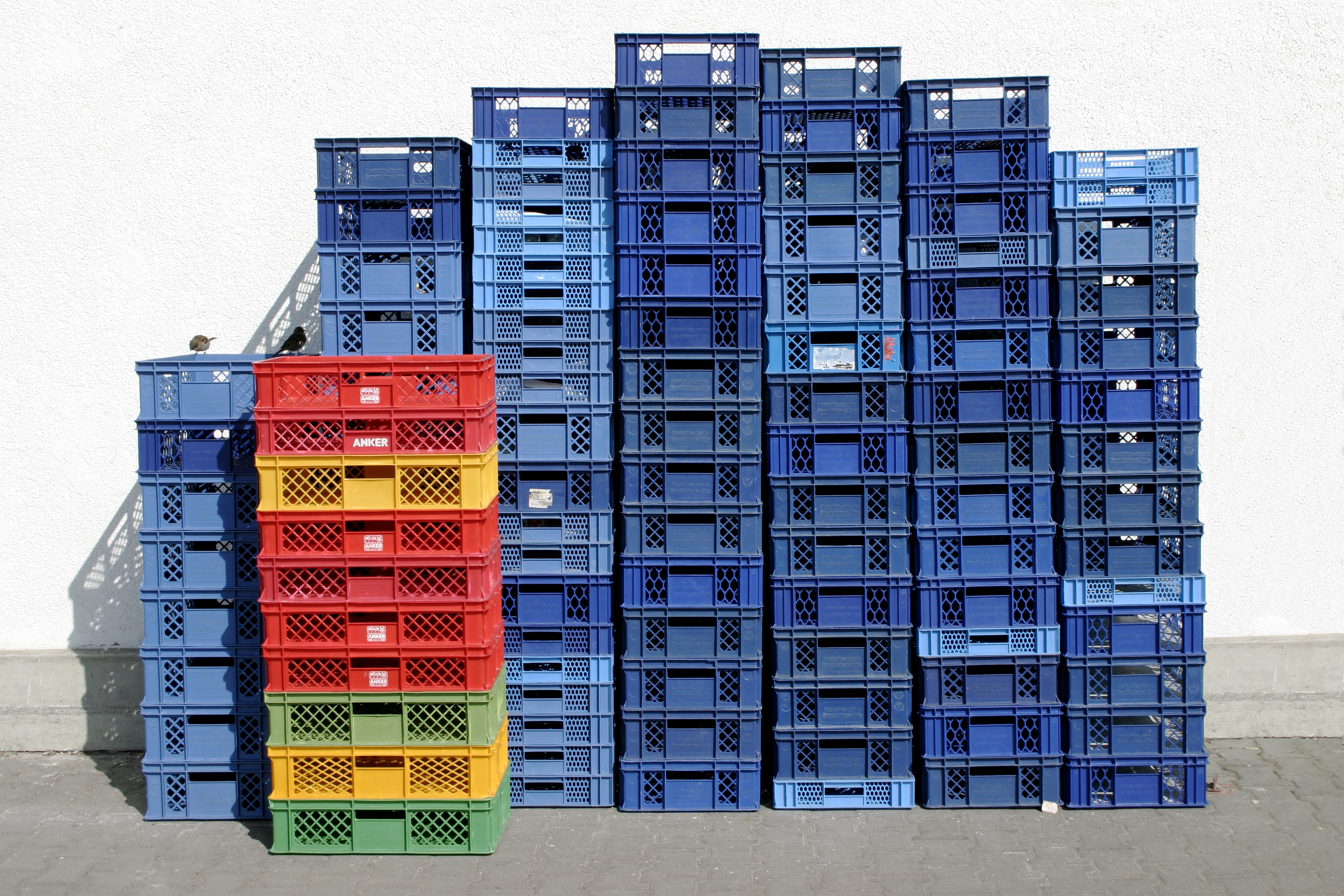
Plastic shipping crates in Italian recycling plant.

Plastic recycling
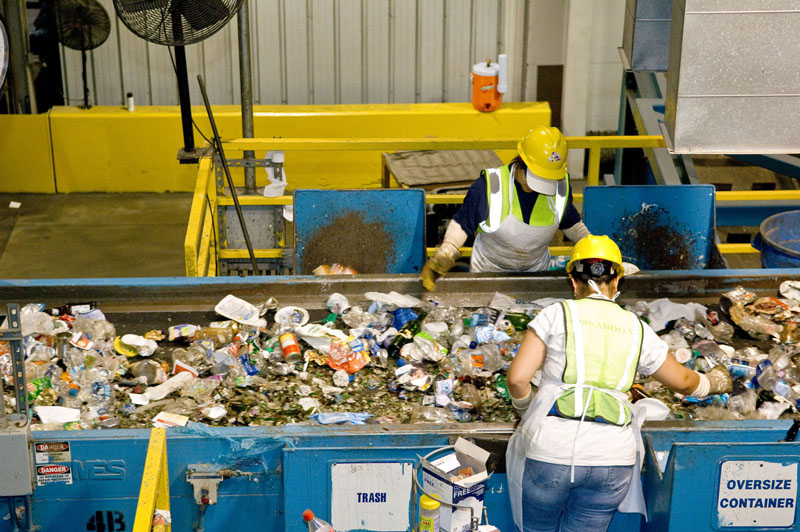
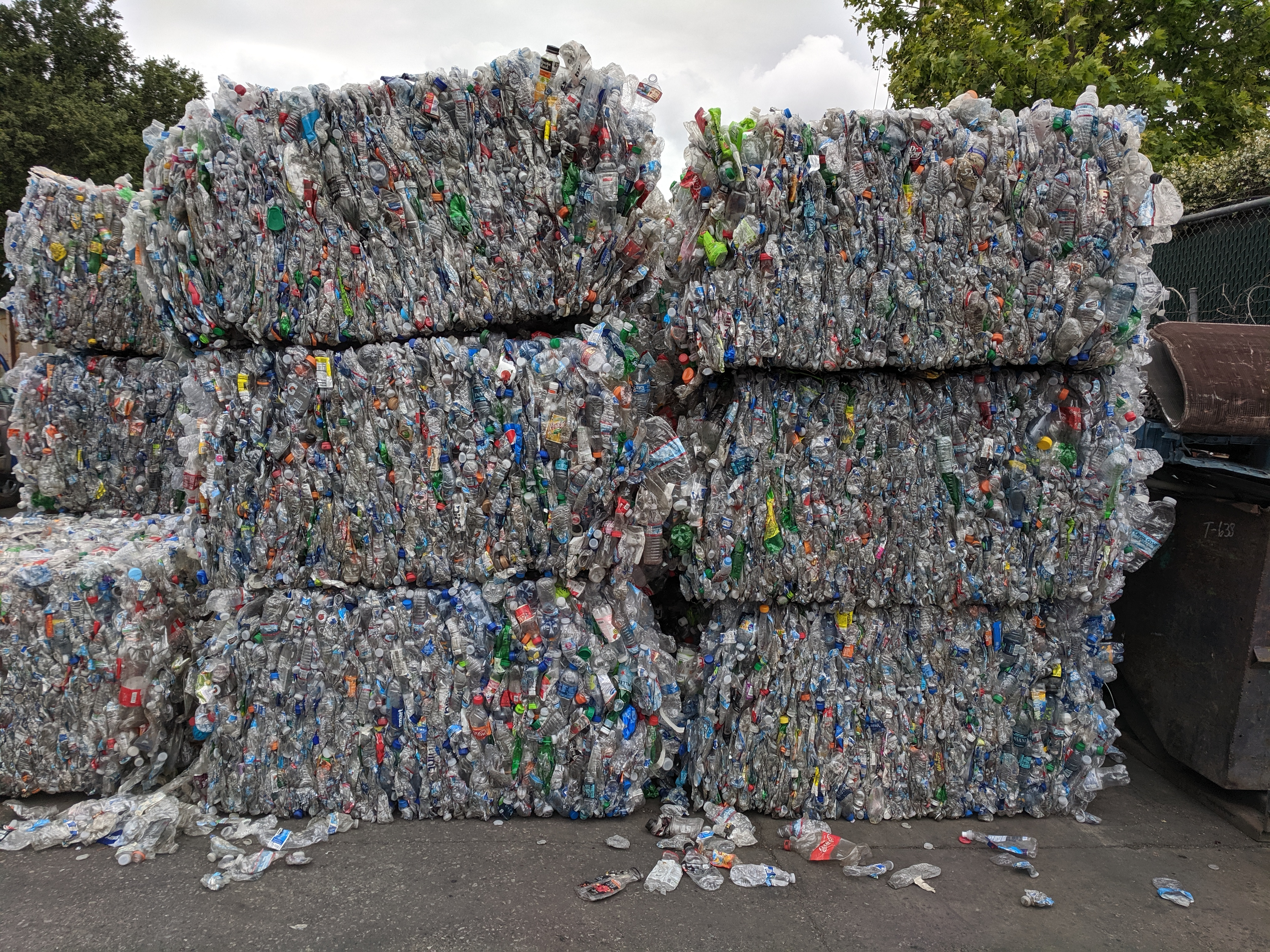
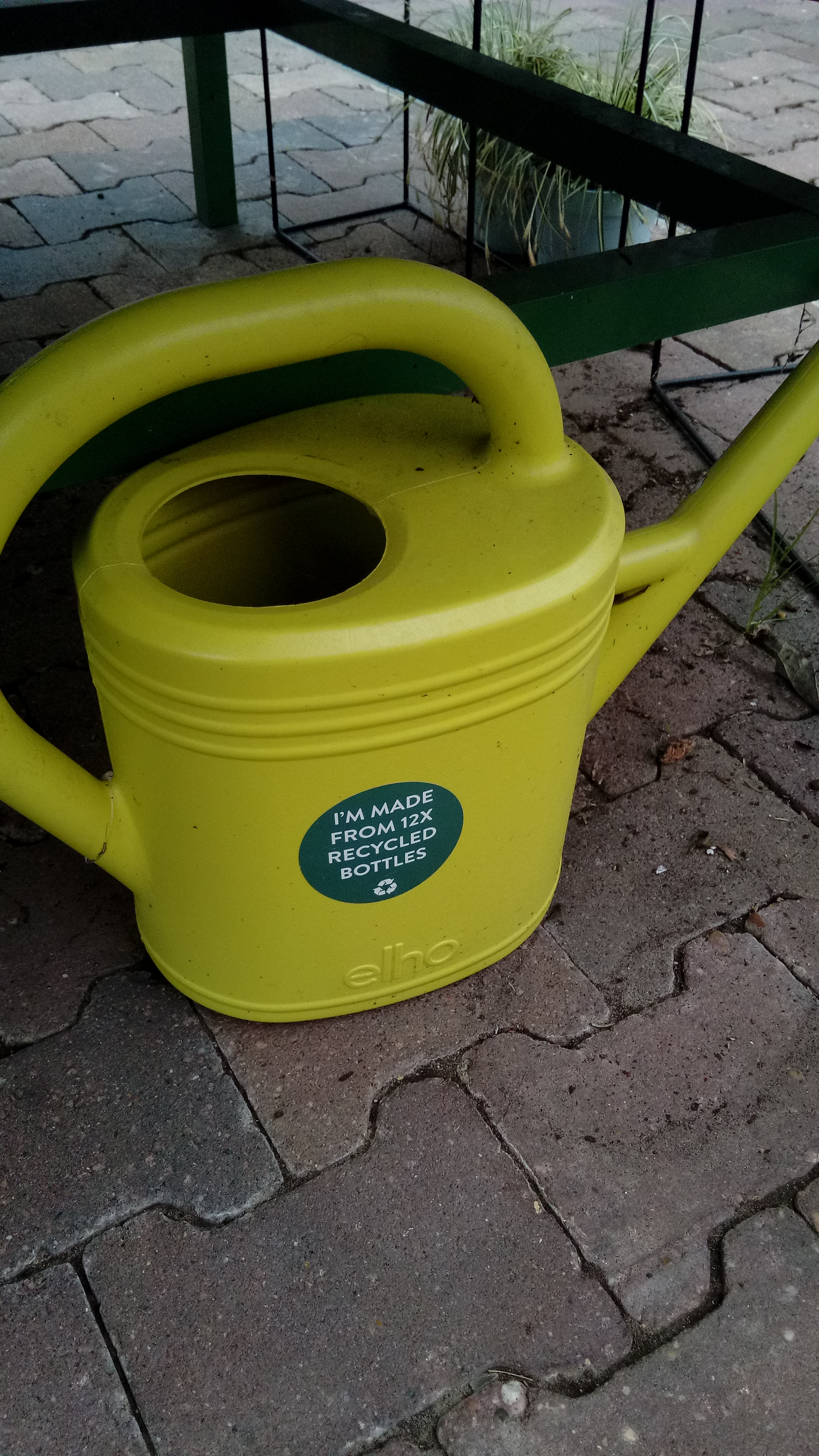
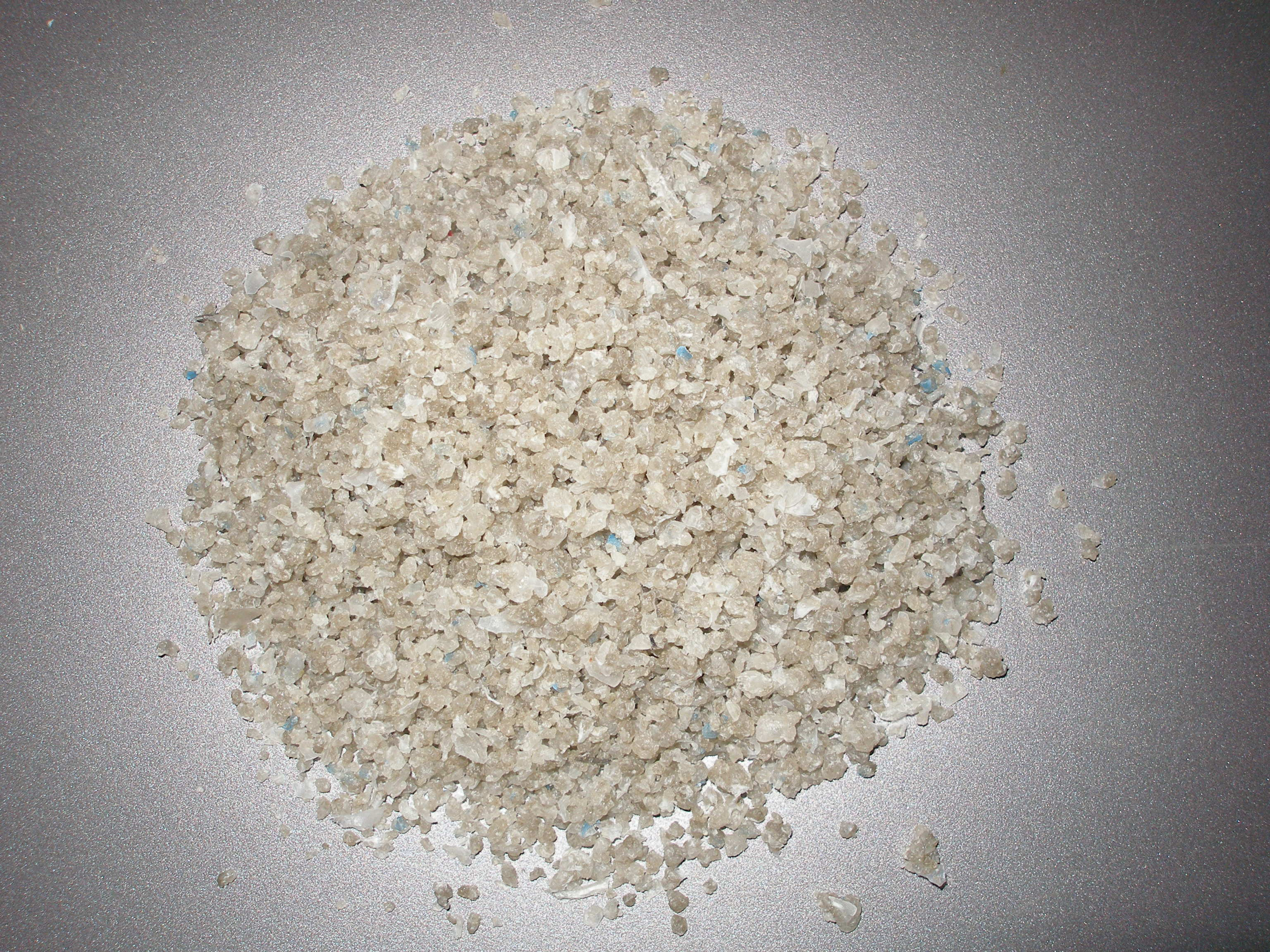
Clockwise from top left:
- Sorting plastic waste at a single-stream recycling centre
- Baled colour-sorted used bottles
- Recovered HDPE ready for recycling
- A watering can made from recycled bottles

Plastic recycling is the processing of plastic waste into other products. Recycling can reduce dependence on landfills, conserve resources and protect the environment from plastic pollution and greenhouse gas emissions. Recycling rates lag behind those of other recoverable materials, such as aluminium, glass and paper. From the start of plastic production through to 2015, the world produced around 6.3 billion tonnes of plastic waste, only 9% of which has been recycled and only ~1% has been recycled more than once. Of the remaining waste, 12% was incinerated and 79% was either sent to landfills or released into the environment as pollution.

Almost all plastic is non-biodegradable and without recycling, spreads across the environment where it causes plastic pollution. For example, as of 2015, approximately 8 million tonnes of waste plastic enters the oceans annually, damaging oceanic ecosystems and forming ocean garbage patches.

Most plastic recycling is currently mechanical and involves the melting and reforming of plastic into other items. This can cause polymer degradation at the molecular level, and requires that waste be sorted by colour and polymer type before processing, which is often complicated and expensive. Errors can lead to material with inconsistent properties, rendering it unappealing to industry. Though filtration in mechanical recycling reduces microplastic release, even the most efficient filtration systems cannot prevent the release of microplastics into wastewater.

In feedstock recycling, waste plastic is converted into its starting chemicals, which can then become fresh plastic. This involves higher energy and capital costs. Alternatively, plastic can be burned in place of fossil fuels in energy recovery facilities, or biochemically converted into other useful chemicals for industry. In some countries, burning is the dominant form of plastic waste disposal, particularly where landfill diversion policies are in place.

Plastic recycling is low in the waste hierarchy; waste reduction and plastic reuse are more favourable and long-term solutions for environmental sustainability. Recycling of plastics has been encouraged since the early 1970s, however, due to economic and technical challenges, such recycling did not impact the management of plastic waste to any significant extent until the late 1980s.

== Rubber tires ==
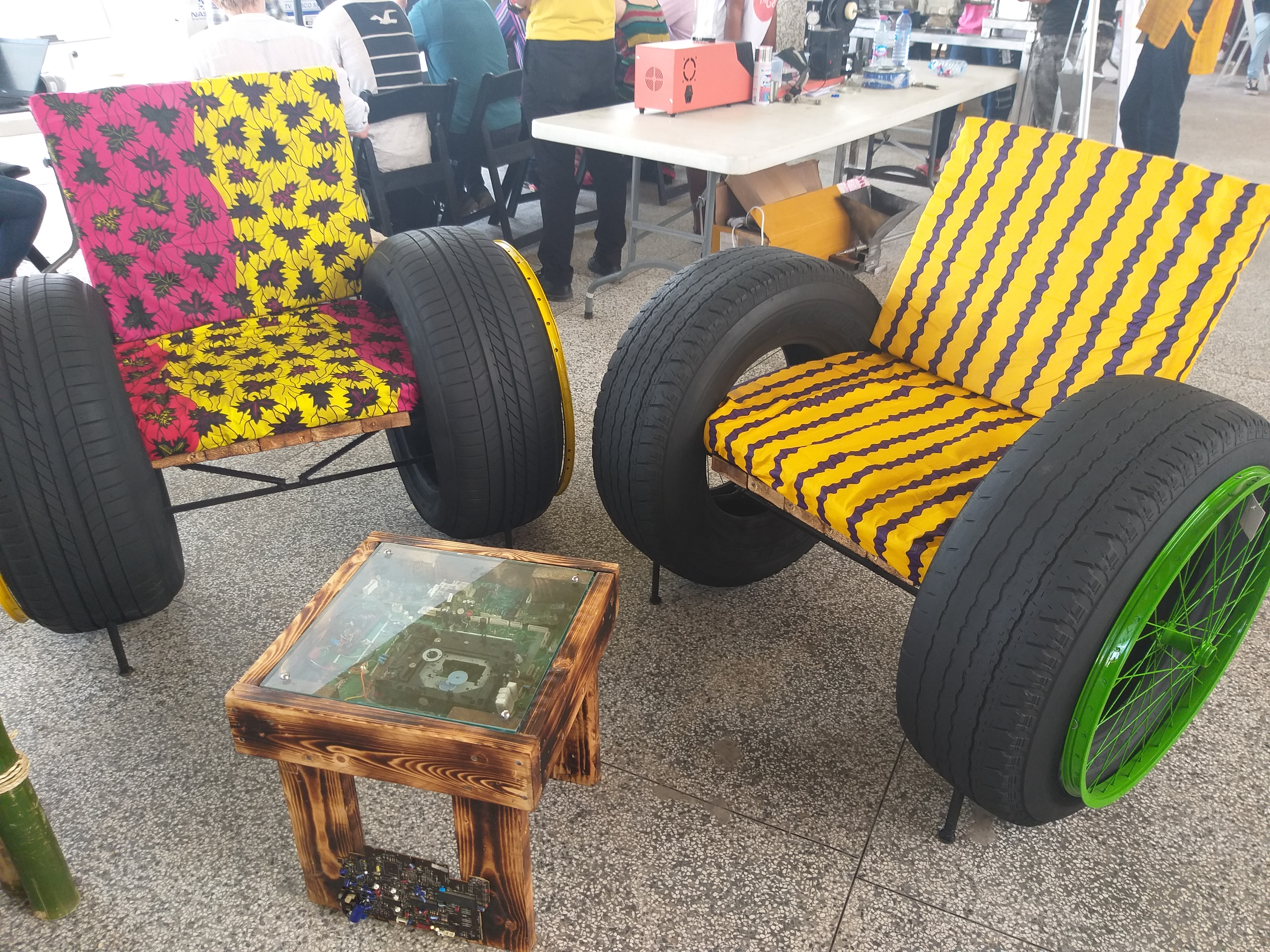
Tire arm chair

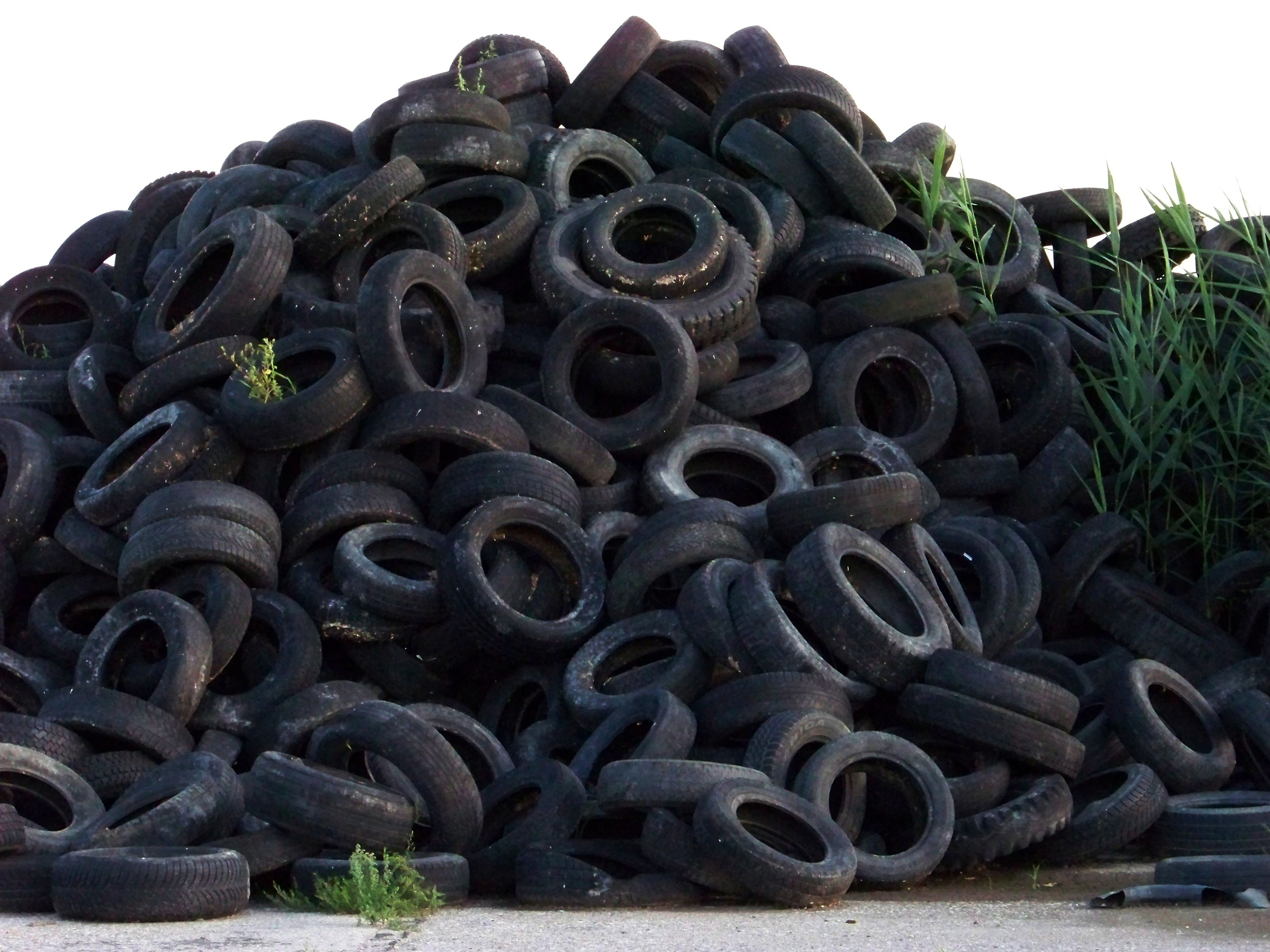
Tires are among the most problematic sources of waste. Progress in recycling has resulted in a major reduction in dumping.

Tire recycling, or rubber recycling, is the process of recycling waste tires that are no longer suitable for use on vehicles due to wear or irreparable damage. These tires are a challenging source of waste, due to the large volume produced, the durability of the tires, and the components in the tire that are ecologically problematic.

Because tires are highly durable and non-biodegradable, they can consume valuable space in landfills. If waste tires are improperly managed they may cause rubber pollution. In 1990, it was estimated that over 1 billion scrap tires were in stockpiles in the United States. As of 2015, only 67 million tires remain in stockpiles. From 1994 to 2010, the European Union increased the amount of tires recycled from 25% of annual discards to nearly 95%, with roughly half of the end-of-life tires used for energy, mostly in cement manufacturing.

Pyrolysis and devulcanization could facilitate recycling. Aside from use as fuel, the main end use for tires remains ground crumb rubber. In 2017, 13% of U.S. tires removed from their primary use were sold in the used tire market. Of the tires that were scrapped, 43% were burnt as tire-derived fuel, with cement manufacturing the largest user, another 25% were used to make ground rubber, 8% were used in civil engineering projects, 17% were disposed of in landfills and 8% had other uses. Globally, tire graveyards are a common environmental hazard, with significant pollutants and other challenges. For example, the Sulaibiya tire graveyard in Kuwait has had repeat highly toxic fires.

== Ship breaking ==
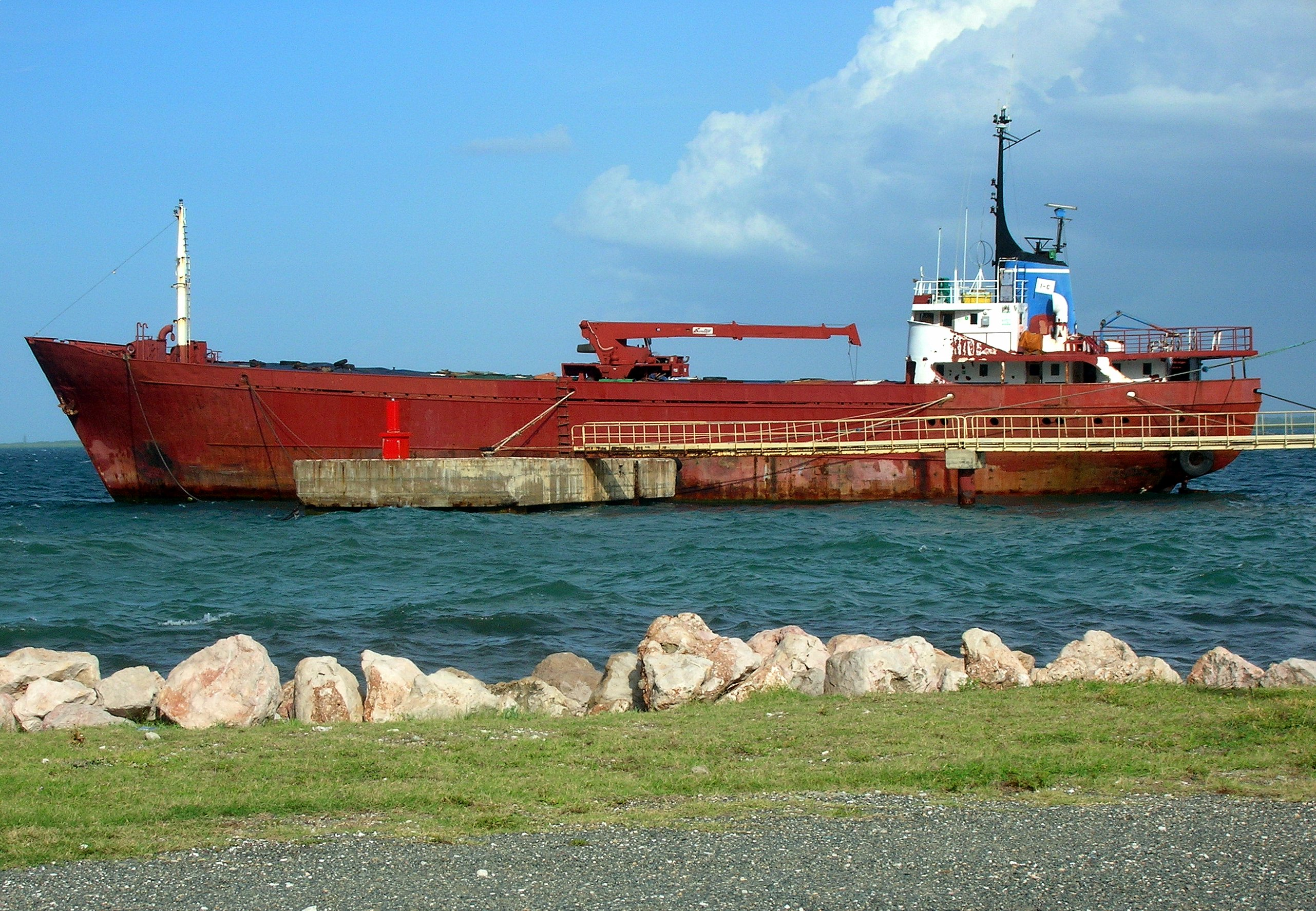
A 30- to 40-year-old general cargo ship anchored off Cap-Haïtien, Haiti, before being broken up.

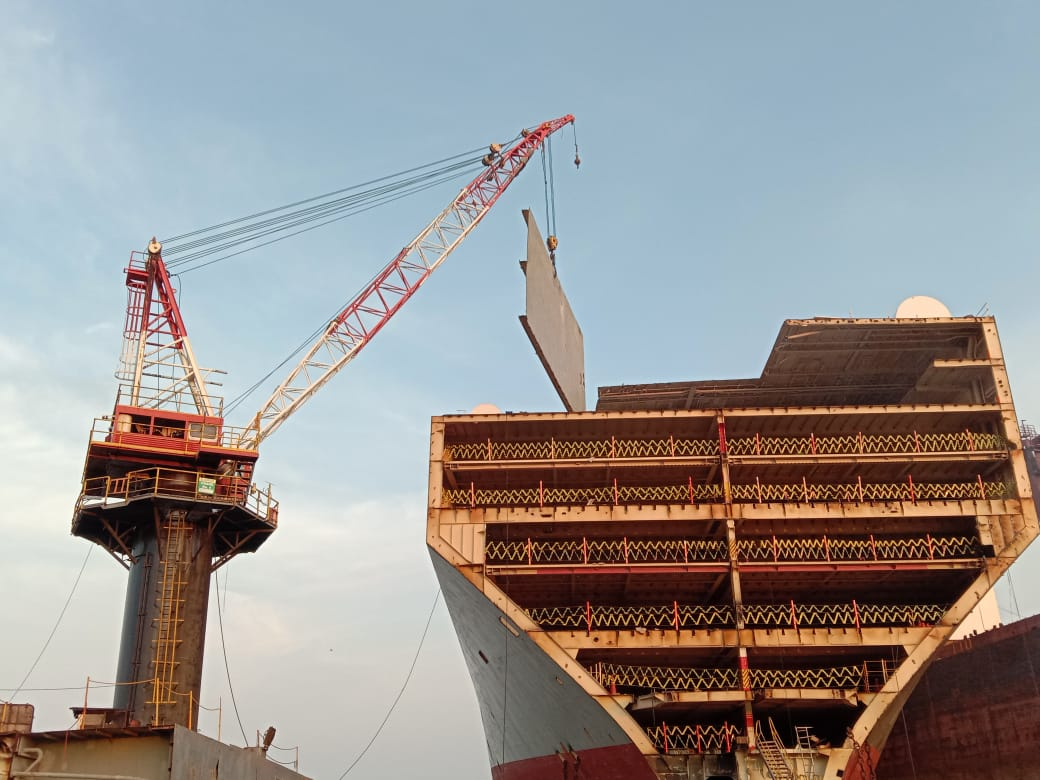
Removing steel plates from a ship using cranes at Alang Ship Breaking Yard in India

Ship breaking (also known as ship recycling, ship demolition, ship scrapping, ship dismantling, or ship cracking) is a type of ship disposal involving the breaking up of ships either as a source of parts, which can be sold for reuse, or for the extraction of raw materials, chiefly scrap. Modern ships have a lifespan of 25 to 30 years before corrosion, metal fatigue and a lack of parts render them uneconomical to operate. Ship breaking allows the materials from the ship, especially steel, to be recycled and made into new products. This lowers the demand for mined iron ore and reduces energy use in the steelmaking process. Fixtures and other equipment on board the vessels can also be reused. While ship breaking is sustainable, there are concerns about its use by poorer countries without stringent environmental legislation. It is also labour-intensive, and considered one of the world's most dangerous industries.

In 2012, roughly 1,250 ocean ships were broken down, and their average age was 26 years. In 2013, the world total of demolished ships amounted to 29,052,000 tonnes, 92% of which were demolished in Asia. As of January 2020, Alang Ship Breaking Yard in India has the largest global share at 30%, followed by Chittagong Ship Breaking Yard in Bangladesh and Gadani Ship Breaking Yard in Pakistan.

The largest sources of ships are China, Greece, and Germany, although there is greater variation in the sources of carriers versus their disposal. The shipbreaking yards of India, Bangladesh, China and Pakistan employ 225,000 workers as well as providing many indirect jobs. In Bangladesh, the recycled steel covers 20% of the country's needs, and in India, it is almost 10%.

As an alternative to ship breaking, ships may be sunk to create artificial reefs after legally mandated removal of hazardous materials (though this does not recycle any materials), or sunk in deep ocean waters. Storage is a viable temporary option, whether on land or afloat, though most ships will eventually be scrapped; some will be sunk, or alternatively be retained and preserved as museum ships.

== Textiles ==
In many countries, there is an active market in re-selling used clothes. In Britain, this dominated by charity shops who sell donated clean clothes. Less saleable clothes are put into the re-cycling waste stream. Textiles are made of a variety of materials including cotton, wool, synthetic plastics, linen, modal and a variety of other materials. The textile's composition will affect its durability and method of recycling.

Textiles entering the re-cycling stream are sorted and separated by workers into good quality clothing and shoes which can be reused or worn. There is a trend of moving these facilities from developed countries to developing countries either for charity or sold at a cheaper price. Many international organisations collect used textiles from developed countries as a donation to those third world countries. This recycling practise is encouraged because it helps to reduce unwanted waste while providing clothing to those in need. Damaged textiles are further sorted into grades to make industrial wiping cloths and for use in high quality paper manufacture or material suitable for fibre reclamation and filling products. If textile reprocessors receive wet or soiled clothes, however, these may still be disposed of in a landfill, as the washing and drying facilities may not be present at sorting units.

Fibre reclamation mills sort textiles according to fibre type and colour. Colour sorting eliminates the need to re-dye the recycled textiles. The textiles are shredded into "shoddy" fibres and blended with other selected fibres, depending on the intended end use of the recycled yarn. The blended mixture is carded to clean and mix the fibres and spun ready for weaving or knitting. The fibres can also be compressed for mattress production. Textiles sent to the flocking industry are shredded to make filling material for car insulation, roofing felts, loudspeaker cones, panel linings and furniture padding.

According to Earth911.com, "Metal hangers, while made of steel, can be difficult to recycle because their hooks can damage recycling equipment and some have a petroleum coating. Some curbside recycling programs do accept them.... Many dry cleaners take back hangers, too...."

== Chat and furnace slag ==
In North America, mine chat waste can be used on snow-covered roads to improve traction; as gravel; and as construction aggregate, principally for railway ballast, highway construction, and concrete production. Furnace slag and to a lesser degree coal slag have been used in lieu of construction and railway ballast gravel in the UK. Clinker, slag, fly ash and in some cases ashes have all historically been used in places such as the industrial parts of Yorkshire and South Wales to make domestic cinder paths.

== See also ==
- Recycling by material
- Index of recycling topics
- Henrik Lund-Nielsen
- Gypsum recycling
- China Metal Recycling
