= Recycling by material =

Recycling can be carried out on various raw materials. Recycling is an important part of creating more sustainable economies, reducing the cost and environmental impact of raw materials. Not all materials are easily recycled, and processing recyclable into the correct waste stream requires considerable energy. Some particular manufactured goods are not easily separated, unless specially process therefore have unique product-based recycling processes.

== Asphalt ==
Asphalt concrete removed during road maintenance, resurfacing, and repair activities can be reclaimed and reused in new pavement mixtures, as an unbound aggregate base, or other civil engineering applications. Very little asphalt concrete — less than 1 percent, according to a survey by the Federal Highway Administration and the National Asphalt Pavement Association conducted annually since 2009 — is actually disposed of in landfills. When asphalt pavement material is reclaimed for reuse, it is able to replace both virgin aggregates and virgin asphalt binder. Similarly, asphalt roof shingles can be recycled for use in new asphalt pavements.

== Concrete ==
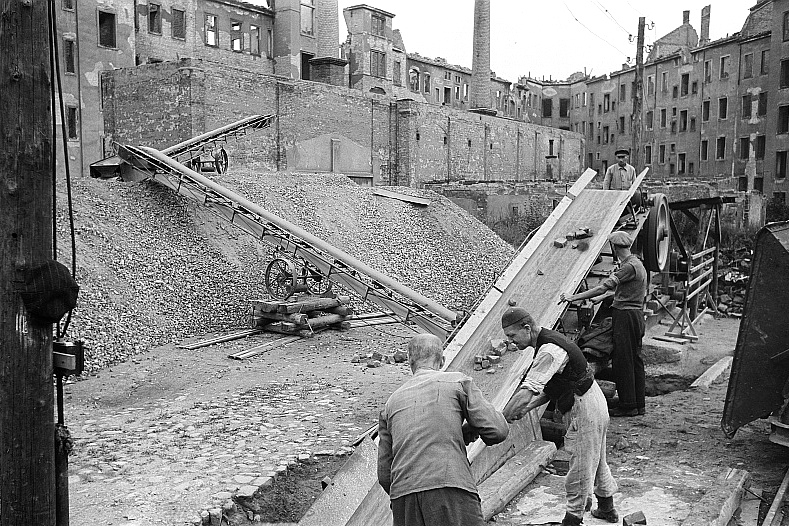
Concrete from a building being sent to a portable crusher. This is the first step in recycling concrete.

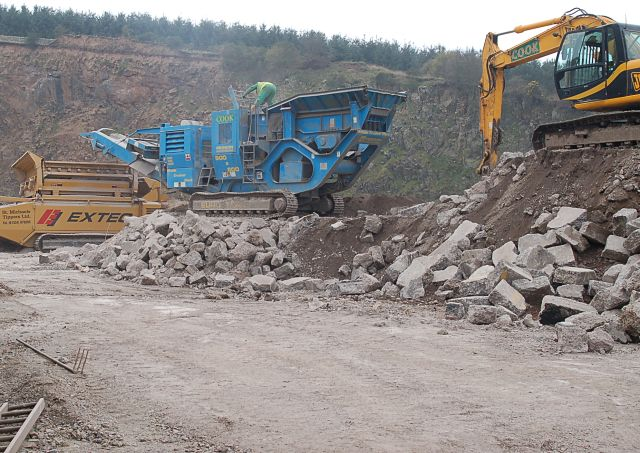
Crushing concrete from an airfield

Concrete recycling is the use of rubble from demolished concrete structures. Recycling is cheaper and more ecological than trucking rubble to a landfill. Crushed rubble can be used for road gravel, revetments, retaining walls, landscaping gravel, or raw material for new concrete. Large pieces can be used as bricks or slabs, or incorporated with new concrete into structures, a material called urbanite.

== Glass ==
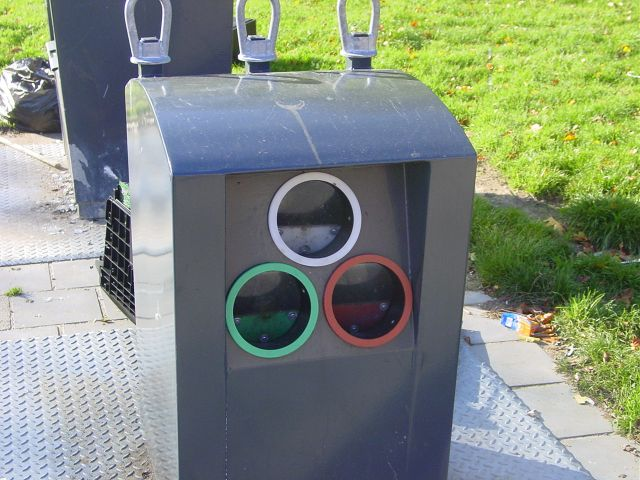
A Dutch public glass waste collection point for separating clear, green and amber glass

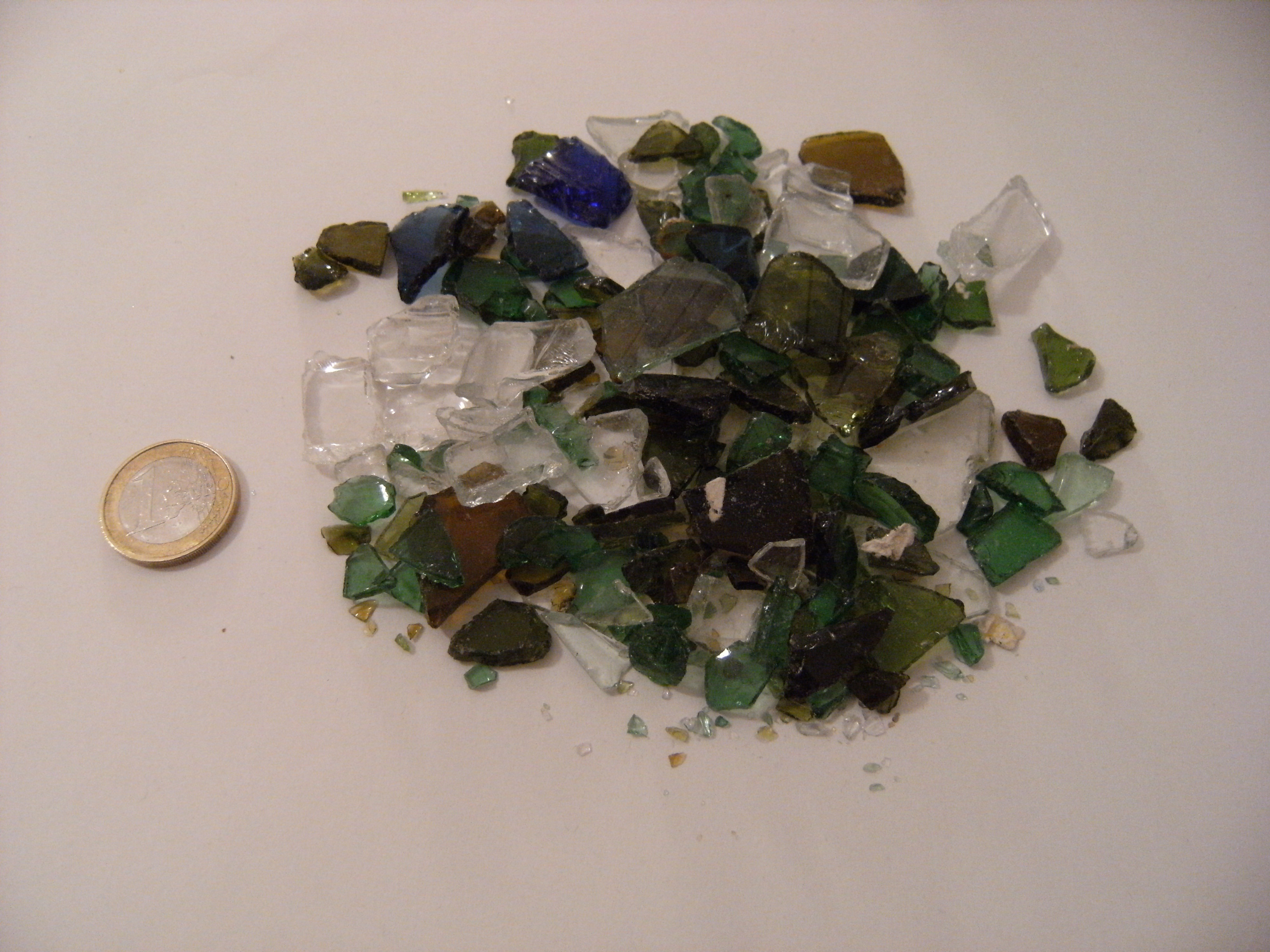
Mixed-colour glass cullet

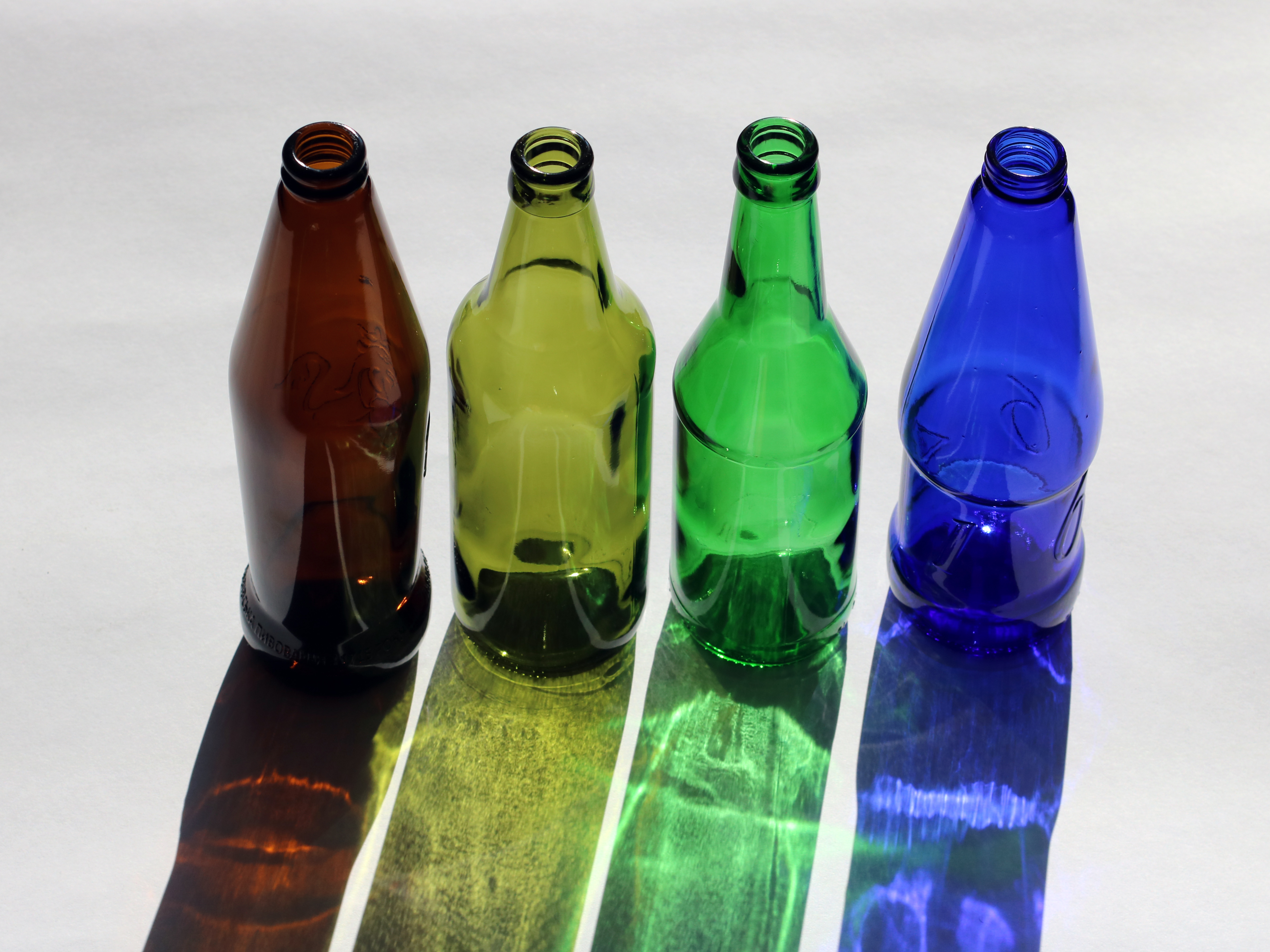
Bottles in different colours

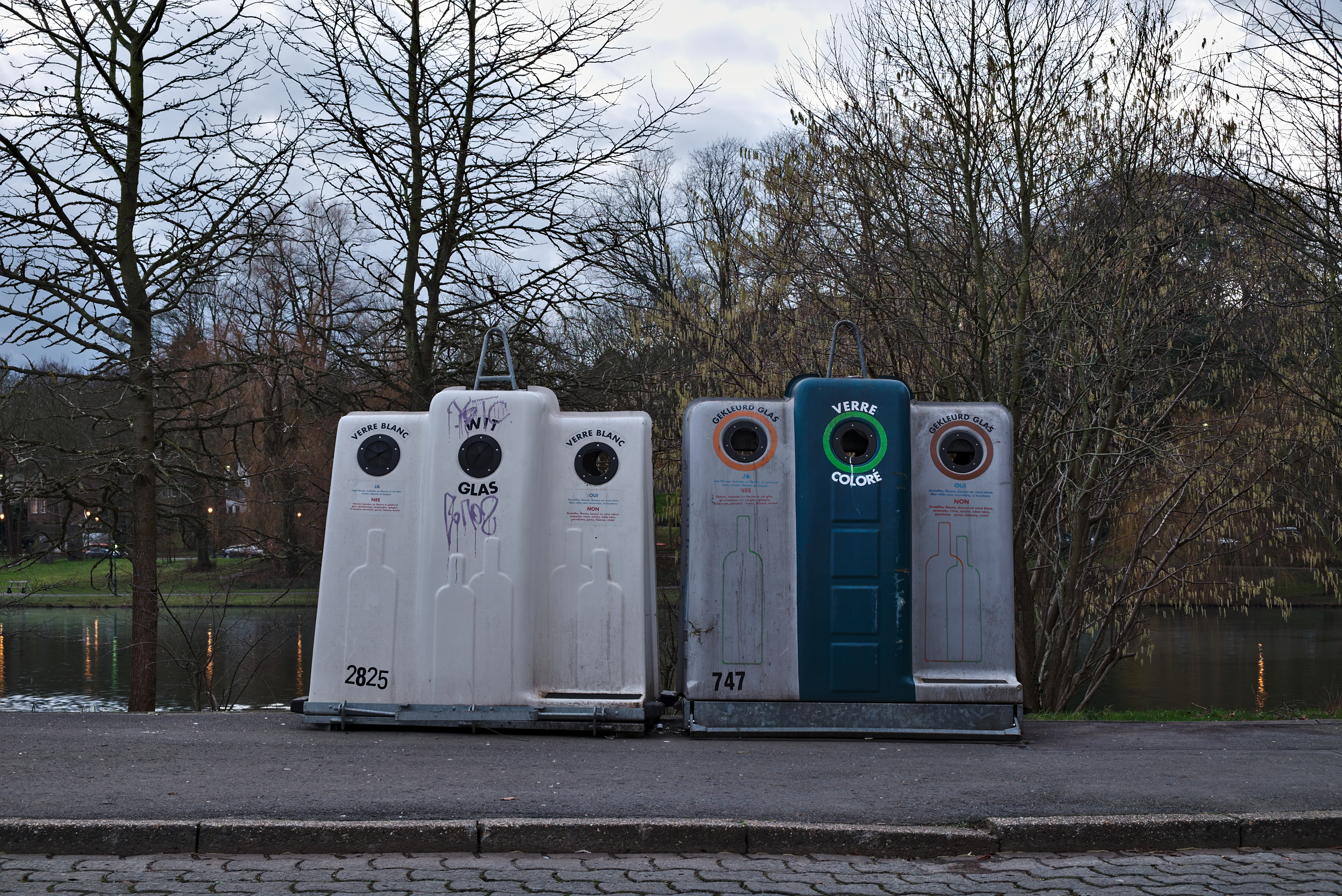
Public glass waste collection point in Belgium. The different receptacles are for different colours of glass.

Glass recycling is the process of collecting, processing, and re-manufacturing waste glass into new products. Glass is ideal for recycling because it is not degraded by normal use. Scrap glass material, known as cullet, is used in glass manufacturing to reduce the consumption of energy and new raw materials. There are two types of cullet:

- Internal cullet comprises waste glass generated by glass production processes themselves, including quality control rejects, material from production transitions (such as colour or specification changes), and manufacturing offcuts.
- External cullet consists of post-industrial and post-consumer waste glass collected through organised recycling programmes.

External cullet requires more extensive processing and quality control because of potential contamination from consumer use and collection processes.

Prior to recycling, glass waste must be purified and cleaned of contamination. Then, depending on the intended use and local processing capabilities, it might also have to be separated into different sizes and colours. Many recyclers collect different colours of glass separately, because glass tends to retain its colour after recycling; collection points often have separate bins for clear (flint), brown (amber) and green waste glass. Separation by colour at the collection point may not be required if the glass re-processor uses optical sorting equipment.

Heat-resistant glass, such as borosilicate glass (including Pyrex), must not enter the glass recycling stream, because even a small piece will alter the viscosity of the fluid in the furnace at remelt.

== Metals ==
=== Aluminium ===
Aluminium is one of the most efficient and widely recycled materials. Aluminium is shredded and ground into small pieces or crushed into bales. These pieces or bales are melted in an aluminium smelter to produce molten aluminium. By this stage, the recycled aluminium is indistinguishable from virgin aluminium and further processing is identical for both. This process does not produce any change in the metal, so aluminium can be recycled indefinitely.

Recycling aluminium saves 96% of the energy cost of processing new aluminium, it also helps divert significant amounts of waste from landfills. This is because the temperature necessary for melting recycled, nearly pure, aluminium is 600 °C, while to extract mined aluminium from its ore requires 900 °C. To reach this higher temperature, much more energy is needed, leading to the high environmental benefits of aluminium recycling. Americans throw away enough aluminium every year to rebuild their entire commercial air fleet. Also, the energy saved by recycling one aluminium can is enough to run a television for three hours.

=== Copper ===
According to the International Resource Panel's Metal Stocks in Society report, the global per capita stock of copper in use in society is 35–55 kg. Much of this is in more-developed countries (140–300 kg per capita) rather than less-developed countries (30–40 kg per capita). In 2001, a typical automobile contained 20–30 kg of copper. By 2014, the copper and copper alloy content of internal combustion engine vehicles decreased to 16.8 kg, but increased again to 24.5 kg by 2023. At the same time, a battery electric vehicle already contains around 91 kg of copper and copper alloys.

Like aluminium, copper is recyclable without any loss of quality, both from raw state and from manufactured products. An estimated 80% of all copper ever mined is still in use today. In volume, copper is the third most recycled metal after iron and aluminium. As of 2023, recycled copper supplies about one-third of global demand.

The process of recycling copper is roughly the same as is used to extract copper but requires fewer steps. High-purity scrap copper is melted in a furnace and then reduced and cast into billets and ingots. Lower-purity scrap is melted to form black copper (70–90% pure, containing impurities such as iron, zinc, tin, and nickel), followed by oxidation of impurities in a converter to form blister copper (96–98% pure), which is then refined as before.

=== Iron and steel ===
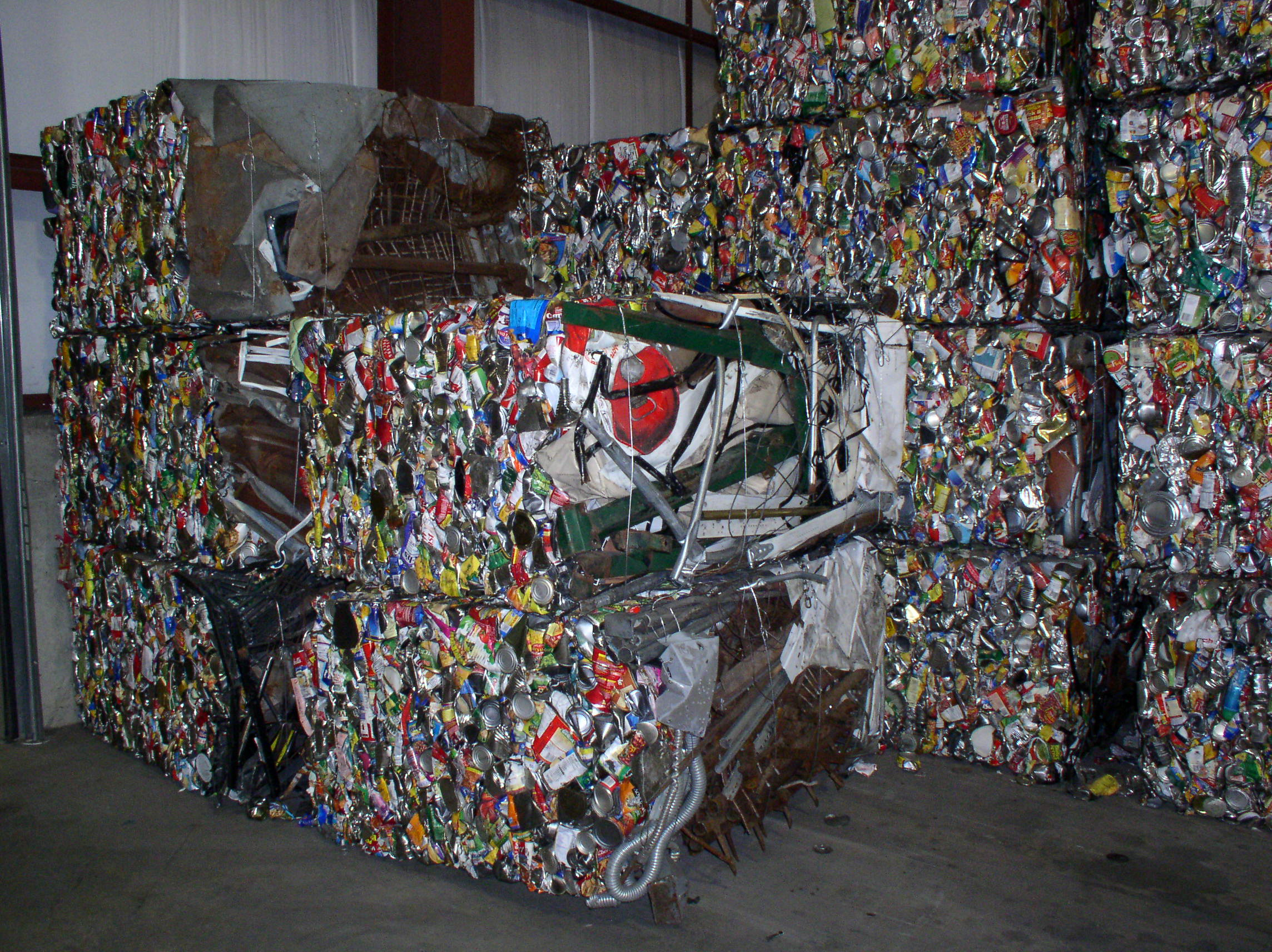
Steel crushed and baled for recycling

Iron and steel are the world's most recycled materials, and among the easiest materials to reprocess, as they can be separated magnetically from the waste stream. Recycling is via a steelworks: scrap is either remelted in an electric arc furnace (90-100% scrap), or used as part of the charge in a Basic Oxygen Furnace (around 25% scrap). Any grade of steel can be recycled to top quality new metal, with no 'downgrading' from prime to lower quality materials as steel is recycled repeatedly. 42% of crude steel produced is recycled material.

=== Other metals ===
For information about recycling other, less common metals, refer to:

- Bismuth recycling
- Lead recycling

== Plastic ==
Plastic recycling
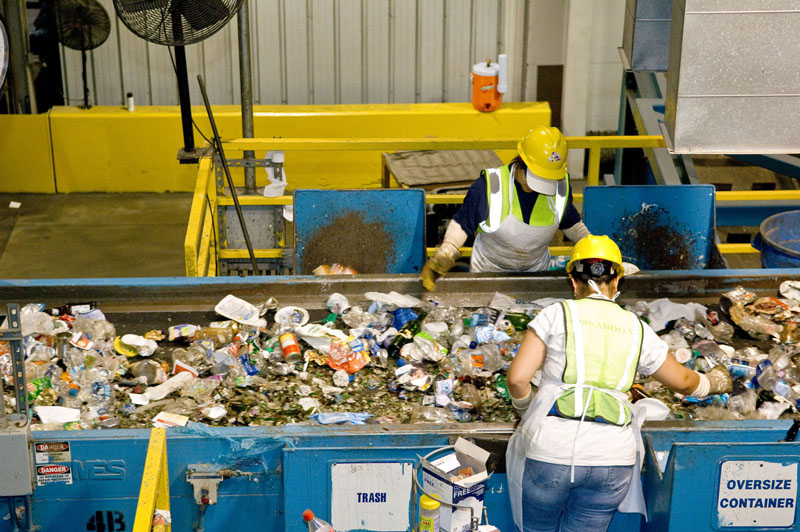
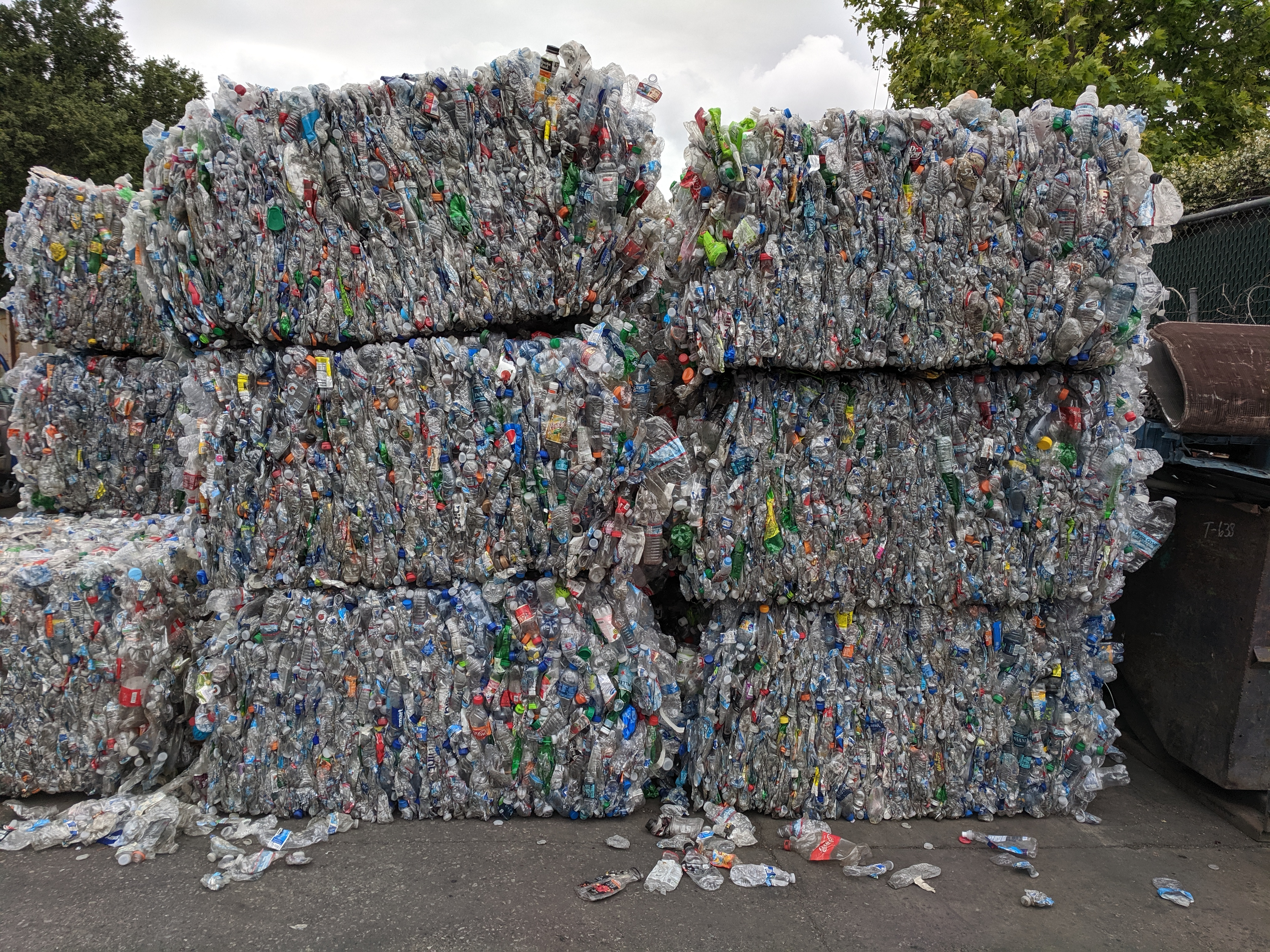
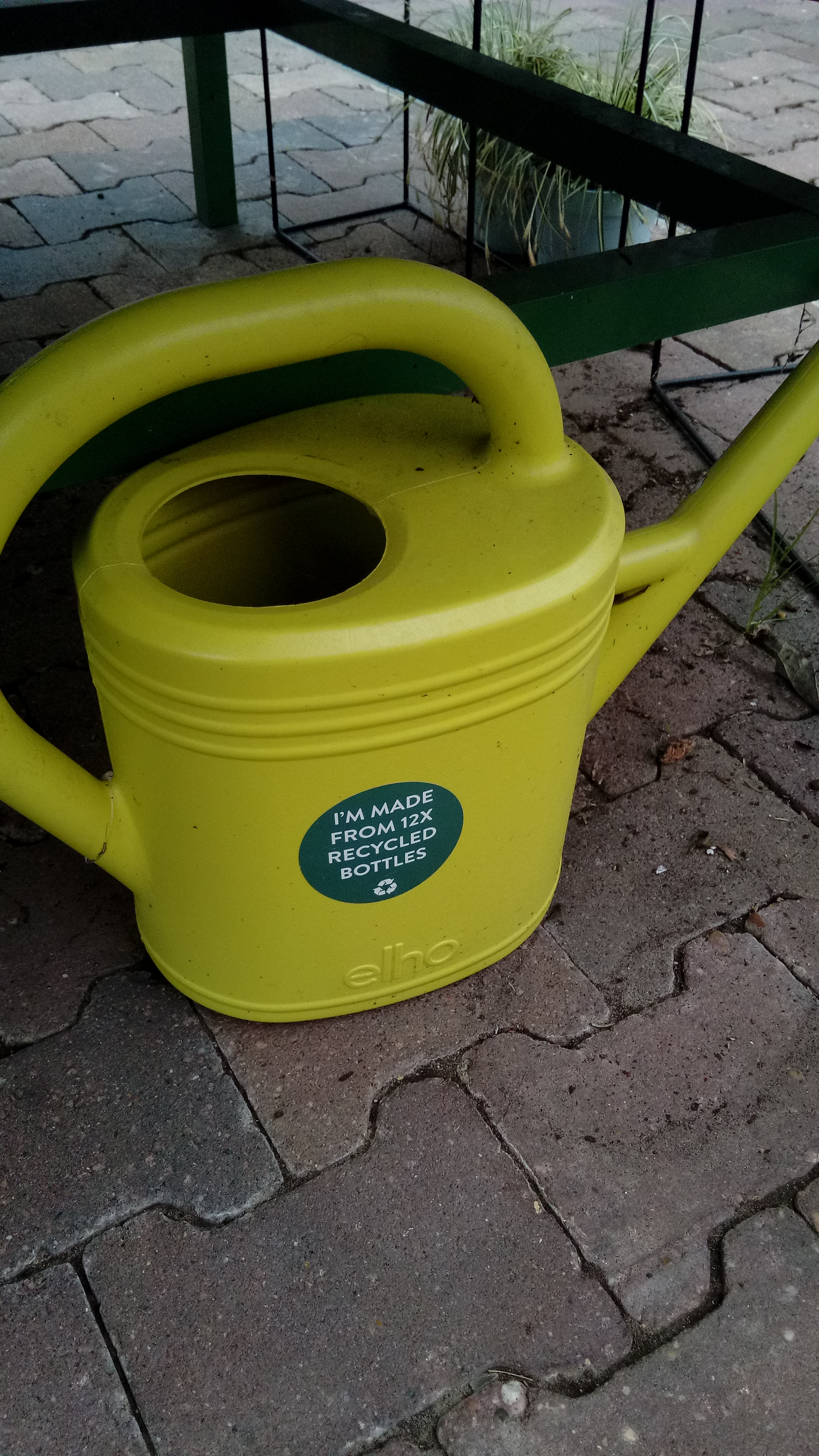
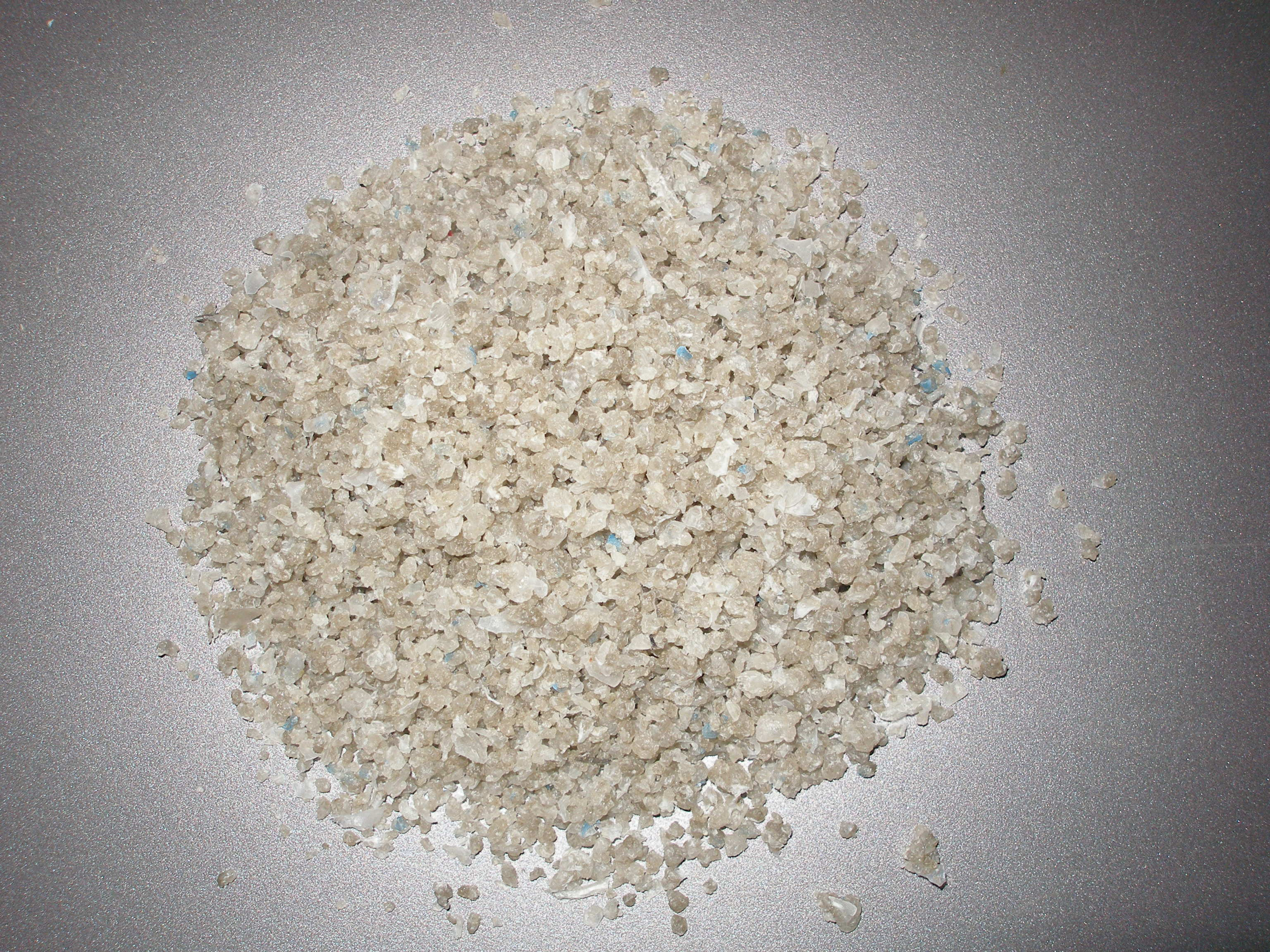
Clockwise from top left:
- Sorting plastic waste at a single-stream recycling centre
- Baled colour-sorted used bottles
- Recovered HDPE ready for recycling
- A watering can made from recycled bottles

Plastic recycling is the processing of plastic waste into other products. Recycling can reduce dependence on landfills, conserve resources and protect the environment from plastic pollution and greenhouse gas emissions. Recycling rates lag behind those of other recoverable materials, such as aluminium, glass and paper. From the start of plastic production through to 2015, the world produced around 6.3 billion tonnes of plastic waste, only 9% of which has been recycled and only ~1% has been recycled more than once. Of the remaining waste, 12% was incinerated and 79% was either sent to landfills or released into the environment as pollution.

Almost all plastic is non-biodegradable and without recycling, spreads across the environment where it causes plastic pollution. For example, as of 2015, approximately 8 million tonnes of waste plastic enters the oceans annually, damaging oceanic ecosystems and forming ocean garbage patches.

Almost all recycling is mechanical and involves the melting and reforming of plastic into other items. This can cause polymer degradation at the molecular level, and requires that waste be sorted by colour and polymer type before processing, which is often complicated and expensive. Errors can lead to material with inconsistent properties, rendering it unappealing to industry. Though filtration in mechanical recycling reduces microplastic release, even the most efficient filtration systems cannot prevent the release of microplastics into wastewater.

In feedstock recycling, waste plastic is converted into its starting chemicals, which can then become fresh plastic. This involves higher energy and capital costs. Alternatively, plastic can be burned in place of fossil fuels in energy recovery facilities, or biochemically converted into other useful chemicals for industry. In some countries, burning is the dominant form of plastic waste disposal, particularly where landfill diversion policies are in place.

Plastic recycling is low in the waste hierarchy, meaning that reduction and reuse are more favourable and long-term solutions for sustainability. It has been advocated since the early 1970s, but due to economic and technical challenges, did not impact the management of plastic waste to any significant extent until the late 1980s.

== Timber ==
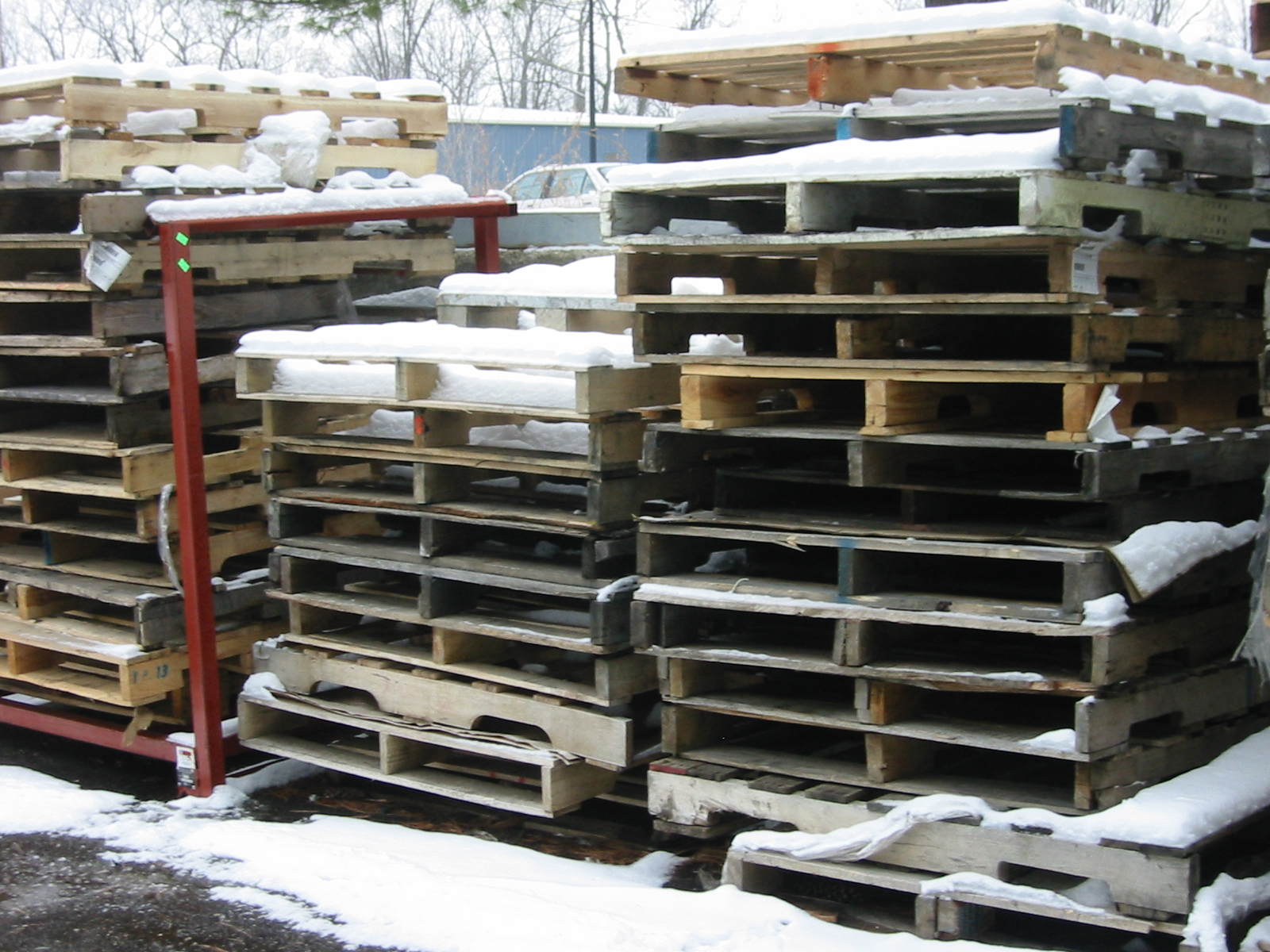
A tidy stack of pallets awaits reuse or recycling.

Recycling timber has become popular due to its image as an environmentally friendly product, with consumers commonly believing that by purchasing recycled wood the demand for green timber will fall and ultimately benefit the environment. Greenpeace also view recycled timber as an environmentally friendly product, citing it as the most preferable timber source on their website. The arrival of recycled timber as a construction product has been important in both raising industry and consumer awareness towards deforestation and promoting timber mills to adopt more environmentally friendly practices.

== See also ==
- Index of recycling topics
