= Gypsum Recycling International =

Danish recycling company

Gypsum Recycling International A/S
- Company type: Private company
- Industry: Renewable Energy and Environment / waste management/ Recycling
- Founded: 2001
- Founder: Karsten Rasmussen
- Headquarters: Nærum, Denmark
- Key people: Henrik Lund-Nielsen
- Products: Gypsum Plasterboard Recycling
- Website: gypsumrecycling.biz

Gypsum Recycling International A/S (GRI) is a recycling company based in Nærum, Rudersdal Municipality, Denmark. GRI offers a system for the recycling of gypsum and plasterboard/drywall waste.

== History ==
The company started its operations in Denmark in 2001. It originated from the largest demolition company in Scandinavia and based on these experiences developed a unique gypsum recycling system. Within a few years, GRI increased the recycling rate for gypsum waste in Denmark up to a world record of 80%.5

== Recycling system ==
The gypsum recycling system from GRI is a complete system with all the necessary elements for taking the waste from the place of generation to the processing facility, where the waste is transformed into a reusable raw material that is delivered to the plasterboard plant nearby at a cost lower than virgin gypsum. The system encompasses: a collection system/containers, a logistics system, mobile recycling units and end-users that can use the recycled gypsum. The recycling unit is designed to be mobile and very compact. Hereby, multiple small processing plants/facilities located close to where the waste is generated and the recycled gypsum used can be serviced using the same recycling unit.

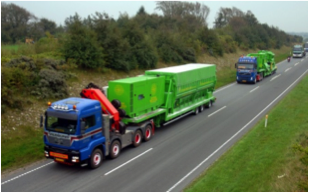

== Markets ==
Nowadays, Gypsum Recycling operates in Denmark, Sweden, Norway, The Netherlands, Belgium and Germany and, furthermore, its technology is used in the US and Japan.

== EU projects ==
=== GtoG ===
As the leading gypsum recycling company, GRI is currently, participating in the EU funded so called GtoG project (Gypusm to Gypsum). The GtoG project is co-financed by the Life+ programme of the European Commission. It started in January 2013 and will finish in December 2015. The consortium is co-ordinated by Eurogypsum, the European Plaster and plasterboard manufacturers association and consists of 17 partners (2 universities- 5 demolition companies-1 consultant in deconstruction- 5 gypsum manufcaturers-1 laboratory- 2 recyclers). The overall aim of this project is to transform the gypsum demolition waste market to achieve higher recycling rates of gypsum waste, thereby helping to achieve a resource efficient economy.

== Awards and certificates ==
Gypsum Recycling International and its sister companies have won several awards within Cleantech, Recycling, and Environmental Technology, honoring the company's efforts for a greener future and reducing the global CO_{2} emissions with its recycling efforts.

Awards include: Cleantech Prisen 2007, Swedish Recycling Award 2010, Climate Cup 08, and Environmental Gazelle of 2007.
