= Gri graphical language =

Gri
- Original authors: Dan Kelley and Peter Galbraith
- Stable release: 2.12.23 / February 26, 2018; 8 years ago
- License: GNU General Public License
- Website: gri.sourceforge.net
- Repository: github.com/dankelley/gri

Gri is a programming language for creating scientific graphics. It is licensed under the terms of the GNU General Public License.

Some users consider Gri similar to LaTeX, since both provide extensive power as a reward for tolerating a learning curve.

Gri can make x-y graphs, contour graphs, and image graphs, outputting the results in PostScript format. Control is provided over all aspects of drawing, e.g. line widths, colors, and fonts. A limited TeX-like syntax provides common mathematical symbols.

An example Gri program:

open file.dat
read columns x y
draw curve

== See also ==
- gnuplot
