= Global Retirement Index =

The Global Retirement Index (GRI) is an attempt to examine the factors that drive retirement security and to provide a comparison tool for best practice in retirement policy. It has been published since 2012 by the French company Natixis, which specialises in asset management.

Norway, Switzerland and Iceland are respectively the first, second and third placed countries. India ranks 43rd, which is the bottom rank; it is preceded by Greece and ranks also last among the BRIC economies.

== Qualifying countries ==
The countries on the list are from the following organisations:

- Economic Co-operation and Development (OECD)
- International Monetary Fund (IMF) advanced economies
- BRICS countries (Brazil, Russia, India, China and South Africa)

== Metrics ==
The Global Retirement Index is a composite welfare index which combines at total of 18 target-oriented indicators which are grouped into four thematic categories to calculate the position on the index. The indicators are then used to create a percentage score; countries are ranked by the score.

The four categories cover four relevant considerations for welfare in old age are listed below, along with the indicators that fall under them:

=== Health ===
- Life expectancy
- Health expenditure per capita
- Insured health expenditure

=== Material wellbeing ===
- Income equality
- Income per capita
- Unemployment

=== Quality of life/environment ===
- Happiness
- Air quality
- Water and sanitation
- Biodiversity and habitat
- Environmental factors

=== Finances in retirement ===
- Old-age dependency
- Bank nonperforming loans
- Inflation
- Interest rates
- Tax pressure
- Governance
- Government indebtedness
