= Georgius Rex Imperator =

Georgius Rex Imperator is a Royal and Imperial Cypher of:

- George V of the United Kingdom
- George VI of the United Kingdom
