= Gris-gris =

Gris-gris may refer to:

- Gris-gris (talisman), a voodoo talisman
- Gris-Gris, popular name in Haiti and Guadeloupe for the Terminalia buceras tree

== Music ==
- Gris-Gris, 1968 album by Dr. John
- The Gris Gris, psychedelic rock band
- "Gris-Gris", 2000 classical musical work by John Zorn on the album From Silence to Sorcery
- "Grisgris", a song by Canadian musician Grimes on her debut album Geidi Primes.

== Other uses ==
- Gris-Gris, scenic attraction in Souillac, Mauritius
- GriGris, 2013 film directed by Mahamat-Saleh Haroun
- Grigri (climbing) or Gris-gris, belay device

== See also ==
- Glis glis, the edible dormouse
