= Henrik Lund-Nielsen =

Danish business executive and serial-entrepreneur (born 1965)

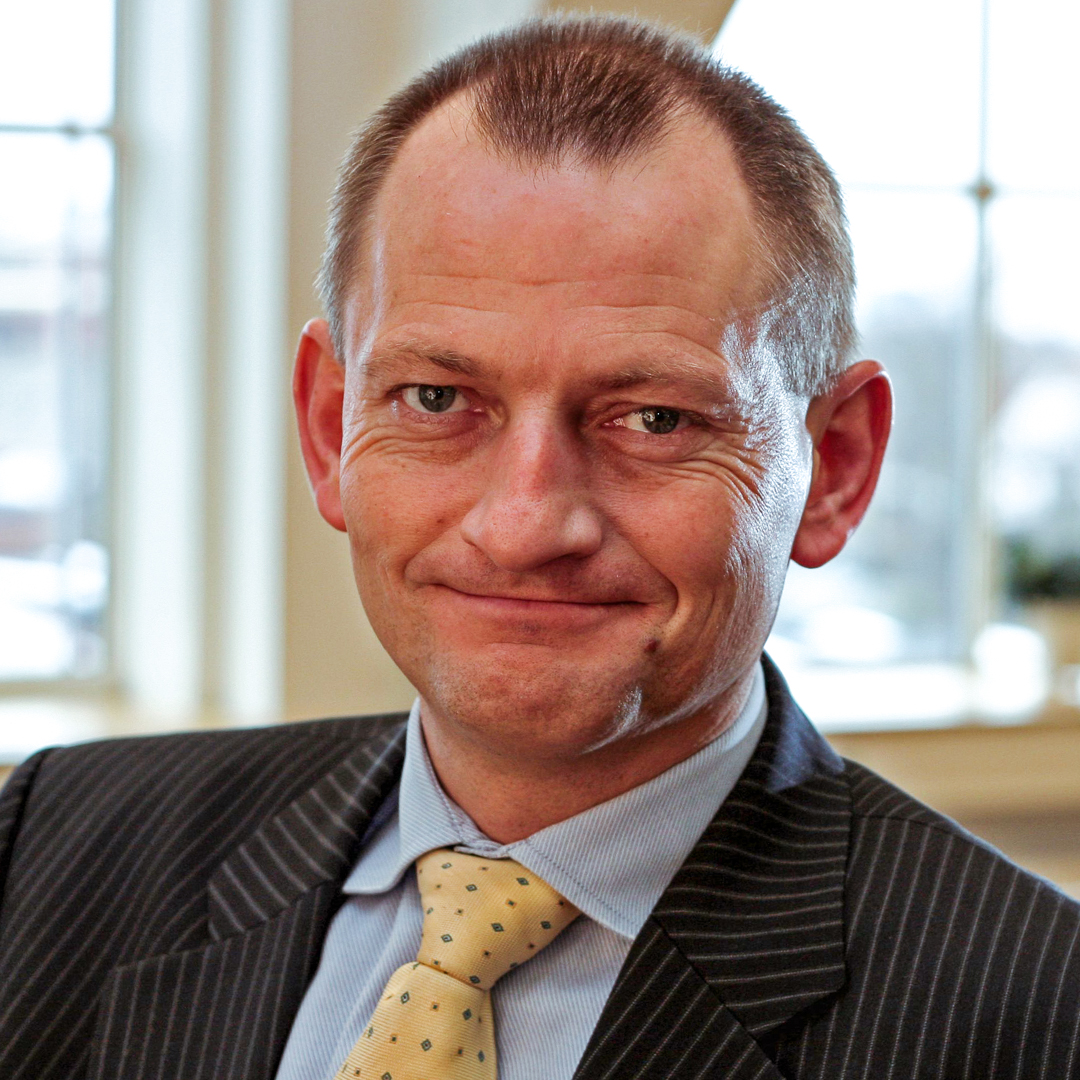
- Henrik Lund-Nielsen, Founder of COBOD International A/S
- Born: February 3, 1968 (age 58); Nyborg, Denmark
- Occupation: Business executive
- Known for: Investor and founder of companies within the 3D printing industry
- Spouse: Katja Remvig
- Children: 2

Henrik Lund-Nielsen (born 3 February 1965) is a Danish business executive and serial-entrepreneur. He is the founder of COBOD International A/S, one of the leading suppliers of 3D construction printers globally. Lund-Nielsen is an investor and founder of several Danish growth companies mainly within the 3D printing, and other technology based industries.

== Career ==
Henrik Lund-Nielsen is mostly known from his role as founder of COBOD International A/S, a global leading company within 3D construction printing.

Since Henrik Lund-Nielsen, at the start of the millennium, stopped pursuing a corporate career and turned towards creating new companies, Henrik Lund-Nielsen has been found in the industries that were emerging. In the early 00's he created his first two companies within the then new and emerging mobile internet industry, which he successfully divested towards the end of the decade. He then turned towards the recycling industry in line with the growing focus on green industries and climate change at the end of the decade and into the new. In 2015 when 3D printing started to find a wider market, he had already founded several new companies within this industry. Henrik Lund-Nielsen is active in 3D construction printing as the founder of COBOD International A/S. A recent announcement describes a long term cooperation between GE Renewable Energy and COBOD for 3D printing of concrete windmill towers.

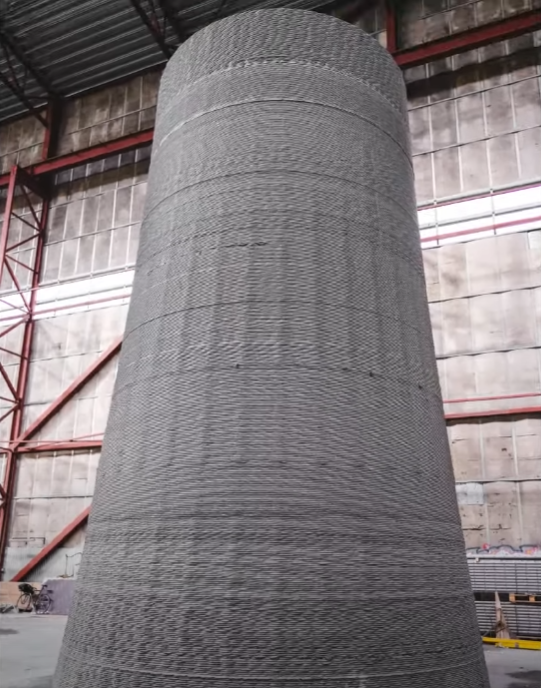
First ever 3D printed windmill tower, done by COBOD for GE Renewable Energy

Under the management of Henrik Lund-Nielsen, COBOD International has, among other, 3D printed the first building in Europe – The BOD (“Building On Demand”) in Copenhagen in 2017. In 2018 the German Peri Group invested in COBOD, following that, COBOD developed the BOD2 a modular 3D construction printer, which with a potential maximum speed of 100 cm/sec is the fastest 3D construction printer on the market.

Since then Henrik Lund-Nielsen pushed the commercialization of COBOD, the company has achieved a string of results in this process:

In January 2019 COBOD delivered the first BOD2 to Kamp C, a Belgium customer following an EU tender competition won by COBOD, it is known that already in 2019 COBOD has sold at least 5 printers.

In the summer of 2019 COBOD delivered the largest 3D construction printer so far to the Saudi Arabian company Elite for Construction & Development Ltd. The printer for Elite is capable of printing buildings with a footprint of 300 square meters on 3 floors. It measured 12 meters in the width, 27 meters in the length and 10 meters in the height.

Also in the summer of 2019, COBOD 3D printed an exact copy of the original BOD Building from 2017. In 2017 it took 2 months to 3D print The BOD. In 2019 it took just 28,5 hours to print the copy, a sign of the remarkable improvements made since then and of the potential of 3D construction printing.

In February 2020, COBOD and Peri together performed live 3D construction printing at the Bautec construction exhibition in Berlin, Germany, where a small house was 3D printed live each of the conference. COBOD now has customers for the 3D construction printing technology in Asia, The Middle East, Europe and the US.

Henrik Lund-Nielsen is a frequent speaker on 3D printing issues in general, and on 3D construction printing in particular, where he is considered to be one of the leading experts globally.

Henrik Lund-Nielsen is a frequent speaker on international construction conferences about 3D construction printing, where he is considered to be one of the leading experts globally. Prior to joining the COBOD International A/S Henrik Lund-Nielsen was involved in the general 3D printing industry for several years among other as the founder and CEO of 3D Printhuset, and his activities previously also include founding and running companies within the recycling and mobile internet sectors.

Henrik Lund-Nielsen holds a Master of Science in economics from the Copenhagen Business School (Denmark) and in 1991 completed an MBA at U.S. international University (now Alliant International University) in San Diego (US) where he received The President's Award for outstanding academic performance. Before turning into a serial entrepreneur, he had a remarkable career as an industrial executive/CEO. After finishing his MBA, Henrik Lund-Nielsen joined Skandinavisk Holding (Industries) A/S, the second largest office furniture manufacturer in Europe, where he advanced several times having been the CEO of various subsidiaries from 1992 to subsequently become Divisional Director in 1998. From 1999 until 2003 he served as CEO/Managing Director at Faber A/S and Faber Holding A/S, which at that time had 1.000 employees and was the second largest manufacturer of window treatments in Europe owned by Velux.

== Personal life ==
Henrik Lund-Nielsen is married to his wife Katja Remvig, with whom he has two children.

== See also ==
- Construction 3D printing
- 3D printing

== Sources / External links ==
- http://www.business.dk/ejendom/fabers-direktoer-fratraadt
- http://video.denmark.dk/video/1747298
- http://www.netpublikationer.dk/um/10138/html/chapter06.htm
- http://inno-mt.dk/dk/om-netvaerket/styregruppen.aspx
- http://www.globalgypsum.com/conferences/global-gypsum/review/ggc-2010-review
- http://www.ccr-mag.com/europes-first-3d-printed-building-the-bod/
- https://www.constructionnews.co.uk/best-practice/technology/europes-first-3d-printed-building-arrives-in-copenhagen/10023479.article
- http://cphpost.dk/news/europes-first-3d-printed-building-erected-in-copenhagen.html
- https://3dprint.com/186860/3d-printed-building-copenhagen/
- https://3dprintingindustry.com/news/interview-henrik-lund-nielsen-ceo-3d-printhuset-advancing-3d-printing-construction-126546/
- https://3dprint.com/210141/3d-printhuset-hype/
- https://additivemanufacturingtoday.com/3d-construction-printing-around-the-wold-henrik-lund-nielsen
