= ISSS =

ISSS may refer to:

- International Society for Snowsports Safety
- International Association for Sports Surface Sciences
- International Society for the Systems Sciences
- International Superstar Soccer, a sports video game series
- Information-seeking Support System, in Information Retrieval

== See also ==
- IS-3 (disambiguation)
