= Artificial turf =

Surface of synthetic fibers made to look like natural grass

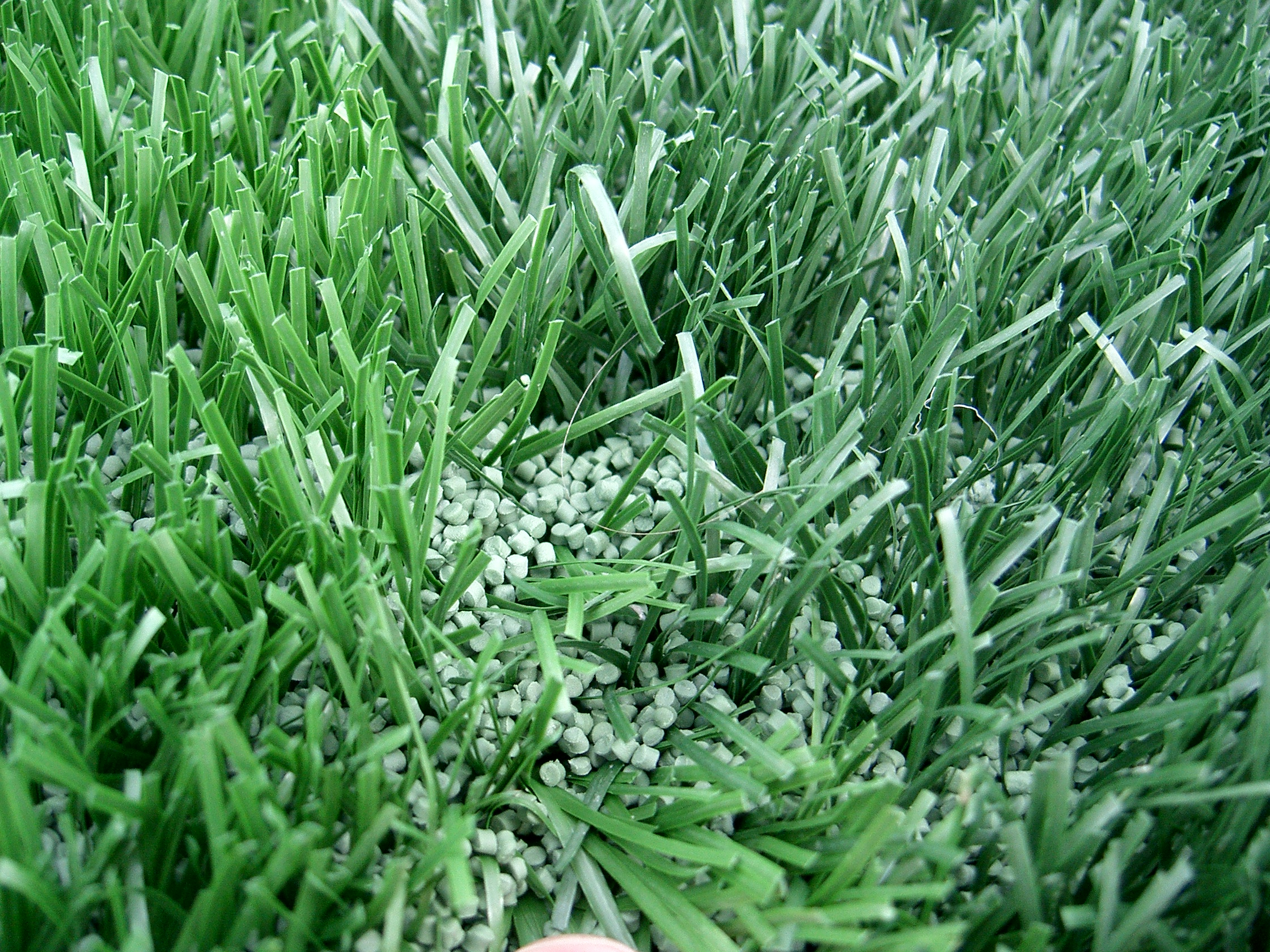
Artificial turf with rubber crumb infill

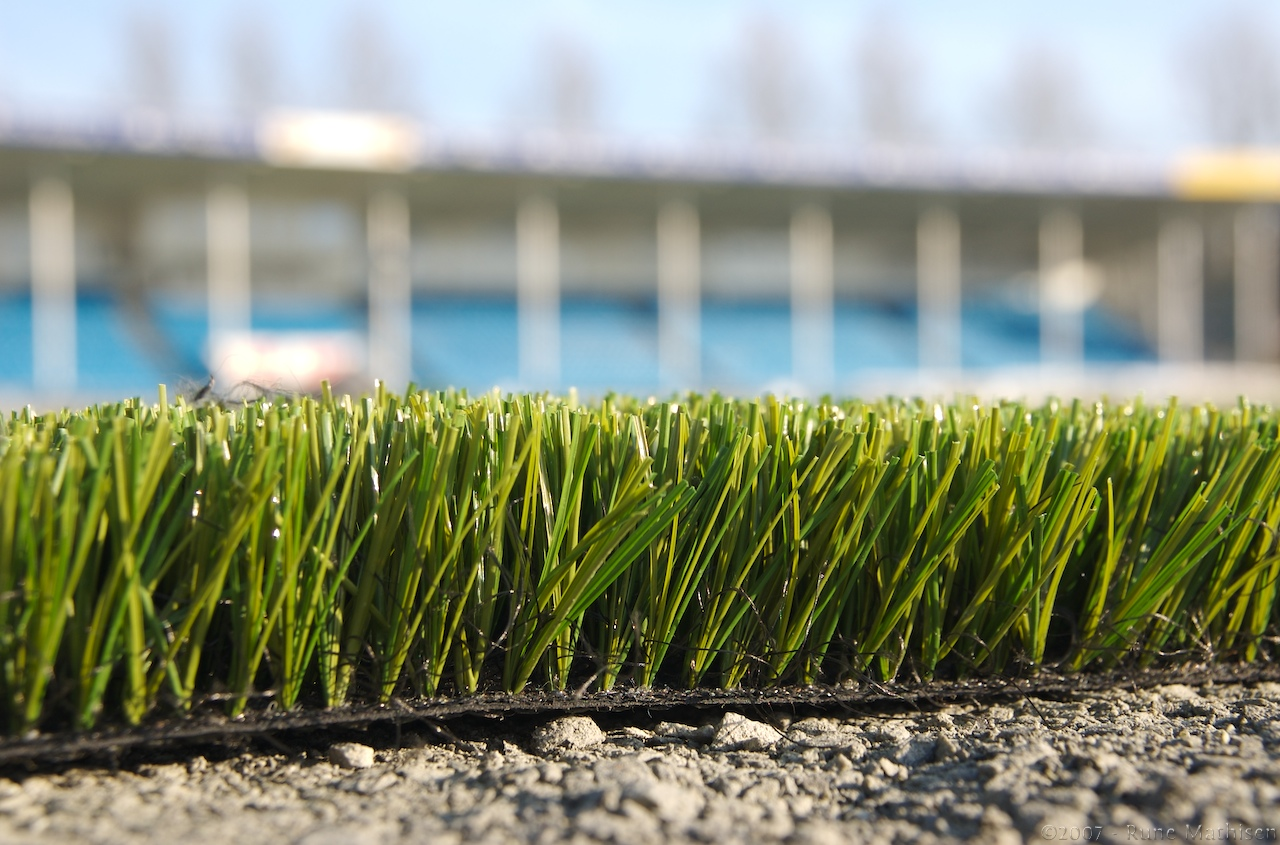
Side view of artificial turf

Diagram of the structure of modern artificial turf

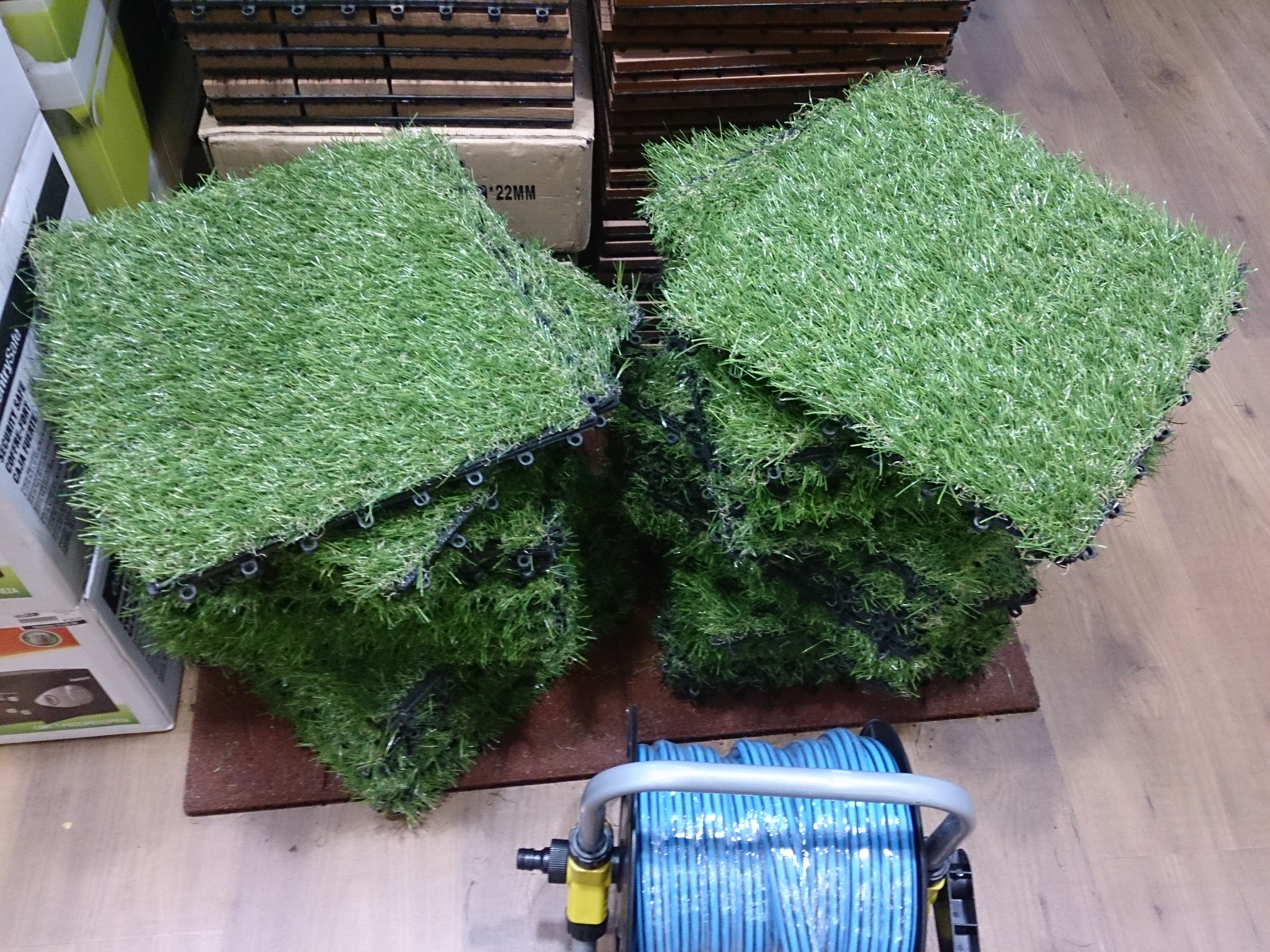
Artificial turf square mats

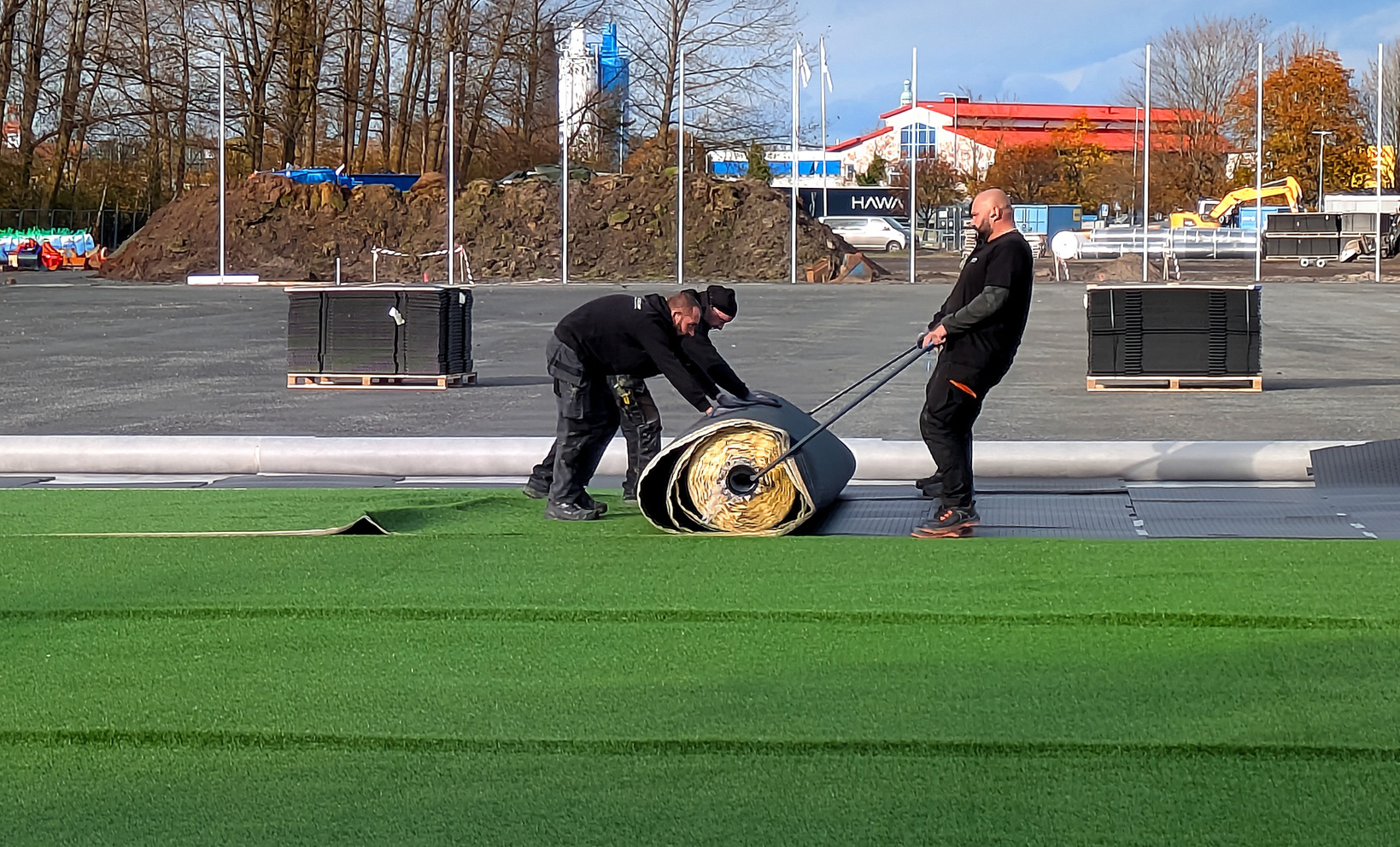
Artificial turf to be rolled out on a football pitch in Ystad in 2025.

Artificial turf is a surface of synthetic fibers made to look like natural grass, used in sports arenas, residential lawns, and commercial applications that traditionally use grass. It is much more durable than grass and easily maintained without irrigation or trimming, although periodic cleaning is required. Stadiums that are substantially covered or at high latitudes often use artificial turf, as they typically lack enough sunlight for photosynthesis and substitutes for solar radiation are prohibitively expensive and energy-intensive. Disadvantages include increased risk of injury especially when used in athletic competition, as well as health and environmental concerns about the petroleum and toxic chemicals used in its manufacture.

Artificial turf first gained substantial attention in 1966, when ChemGrass was installed in the year-old Astrodome, developed by Monsanto and rebranded as AstroTurf, now a generic trademark (registered to a new owner) for any artificial turf.

The first-generation system of shortpile fibers without infill of the 1960s has largely been replaced by two more. The second features longer fibers and sand infill and the third adds recycled crumb rubber to the sand. Compared to earlier systems, modern artificial turf more closely resembles grass in appearance and is also considered safer for athletic competition. However, it is still not widely considered to be equal to grass. Sports clubs, leagues, unions, and individual athletes have frequently spoken out and campaigned against it, while local governments have enacted and enforced laws restricting or banning its use.

== History ==
David Chaney, who moved to Raleigh, North Carolina, in 1960 and later served as Dean of the North Carolina State University College of Textiles, headed the team of Research Triangle Park researchers who created the first notable artificial turf. That accomplishment led Sports Illustrated to declare Chaney as the man "responsible for indoor major league baseball and millions of welcome mats."

Artificial turf was first installed in 1964 on a recreation area at the Moses Brown School in Providence, Rhode Island. The material came to public prominence in 1966, when AstroTurf was installed in the Astrodome in Houston, Texas. The state-of-the-art indoor stadium had attempted to use natural grass during its initial season in 1965, but this failed miserably and the field conditions were grossly inadequate during the second half of the season, with the dead grass painted green. Due to a limited supply of the new artificial grass, only the infield was installed before the Houston Astros' home opener in April 1966; the outfield was installed in early summer during an extended Astros road trip and first used after the All-Star Break in July.

The use of AstroTurf and similar surfaces became widespread in the United States (U.S.) and Canada in the early 1970s, installed in both indoor and outdoor stadiums used for baseball and American football. More than 11,000 artificial turf playing fields have been installed nationally. More than 1,200 were installed in the U.S. in 2013 alone, according to the industry group the Synthetic Turf Council.

== Sports applications ==
=== Baseball ===
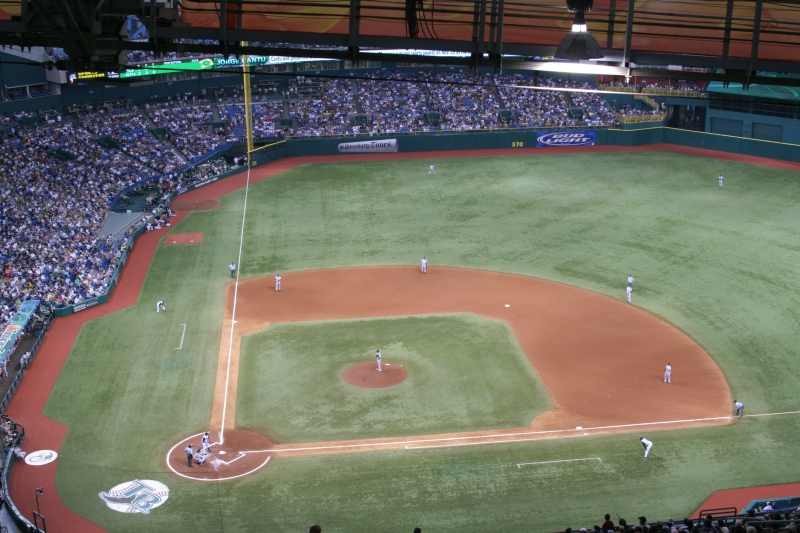
Tropicana Field with its artificial turf field.

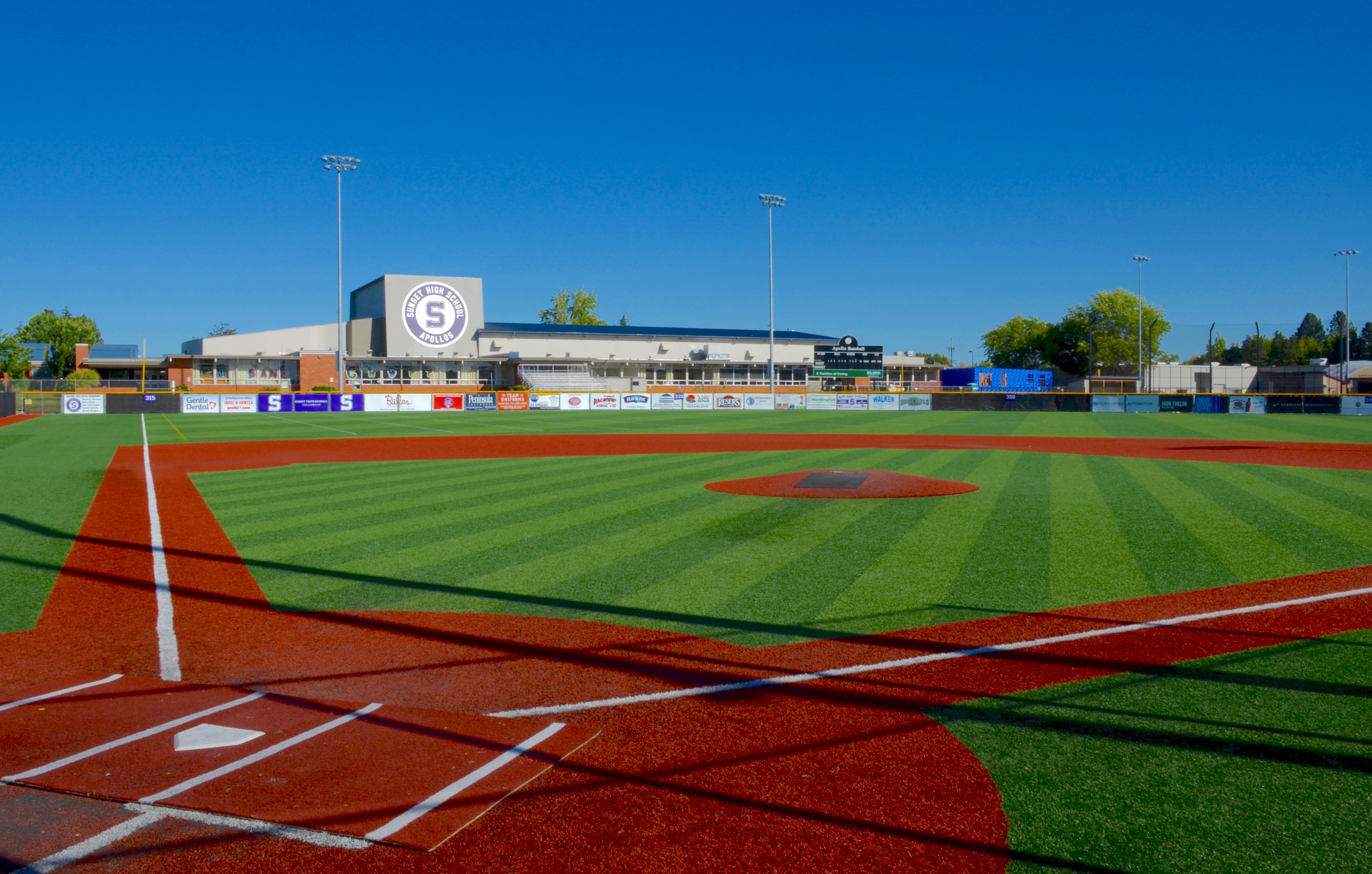
An artificial-turf field at a high school in Oregon.

Artificial turf was first used in Major League Baseball (MLB) in the Houston Astrodome in 1966, replacing the grass field used when the stadium opened a year earlier. Even though the grass was specifically bred for indoor use, the dome's semi-transparent Lucite ceiling panels, which had been painted white to cut down on glare that bothered the players, did not pass enough sunlight to support the grass. For most of the 1965 season, the Astros played on green-painted dirt and dead grass.

The solution was to install a new type of artificial grass on the field, ChemGrass, which became known as AstroTurf. Given its early use, the term astroturf has since been used as a generic term for any artificial turf. Because the supply of AstroTurf was still low, only a limited amount was available for the first home game. There was not enough for the entire outfield, but there was enough to cover the traditional grass portion of the infield. The outfield remained painted dirt until after the All-Star Break. The team was sent on an extended road trip before the break, and on July 19, 1966, the installation of the outfield portion of AstroTurf was completed.

The Chicago White Sox became the first team to install artificial turf in an outdoor stadium, as they used it only in the infield and adjacent foul territory at Comiskey Park from 1969 through 1975. Artificial turf was later installed in other new multi-purpose stadiums such as Pittsburgh's Three Rivers Stadium, Philadelphia's Veterans Stadium, and Cincinnati's Riverfront Stadium. Early AstroTurf baseball fields used the traditional all-dirt path, but starting in 1970 with Cincinnati's Riverfront Stadium, teams began using the "base cutout" layout on the diamond, with the only dirt being on the pitcher's mound, batter's circle, and in a five-sided diamond-shaped "sliding box" around each base. With this layout, a painted arc would indicate where the edge of the outfield grass would normally be, to assist fielders in positioning themselves properly. The last stadium in MLB to use this configuration was Rogers Centre in Toronto, when they switched to an all-dirt infield (but kept the artificial turf) for the 2016 season.

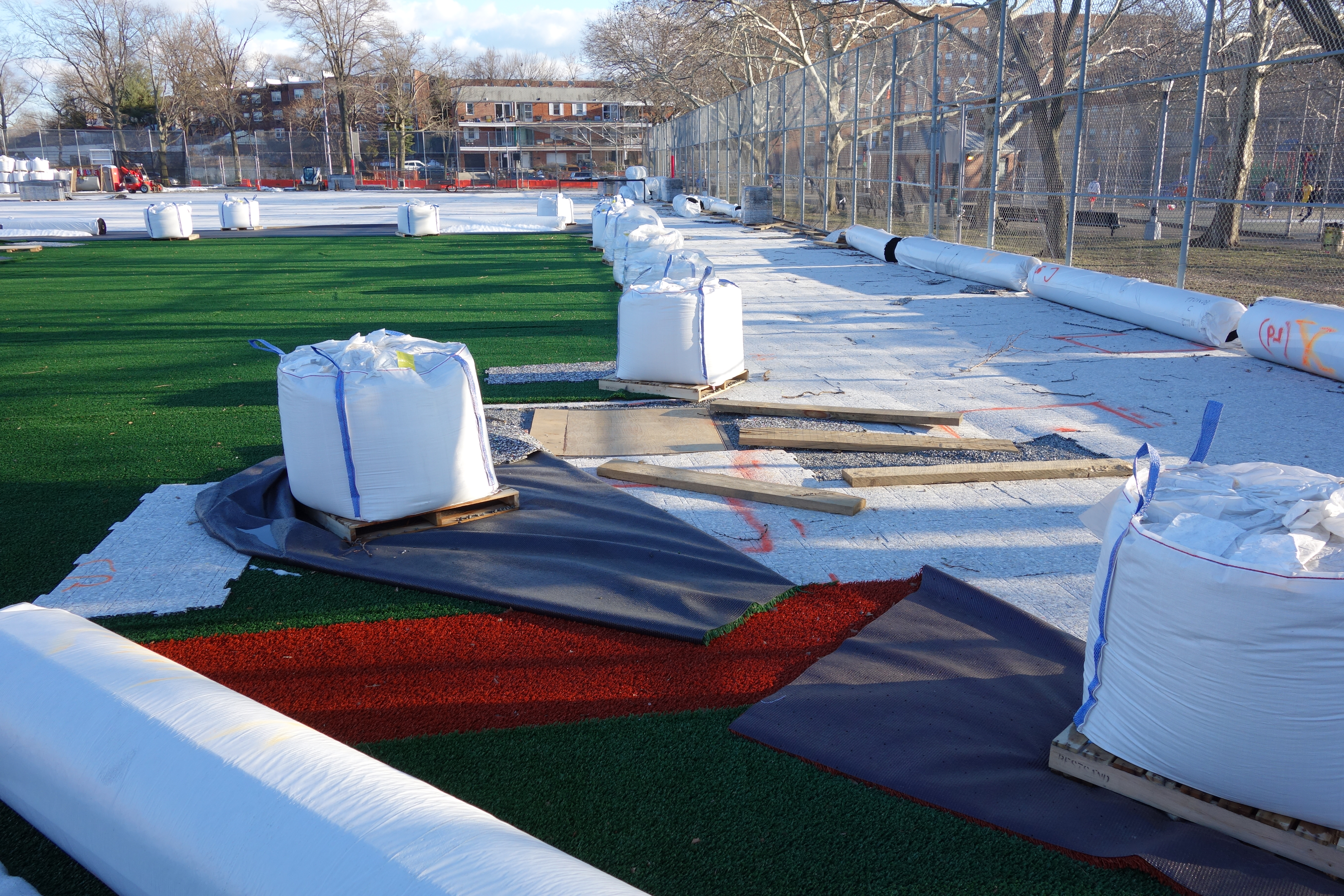
Artificial turf being installed on a baseball field in Queens, New York City.

The biggest difference in play on artificial turf was that the ball bounced higher than on real grass and also traveled faster, causing infielders to play farther back than they would normally so that they would have sufficient time to react. The ball also had a truer bounce than on grass so that on long throws fielders could deliberately bounce the ball in front of the player they were throwing to, with the certainty that it would travel in a straight line and not be deflected to the right or left. The biggest impact on the game of "turf", as it came to be called, was on the bodies of the players. The artificial surface, which was generally placed over a concrete base, had much less give to it than a traditional dirt and grass field did, which caused more wear-and-tear on knees, ankles, feet, and the lower back, possibly even shortening the careers of those players who played a significant portion of their games on artificial surfaces. Players also complained that the turf was much hotter than grass, sometimes causing the metal spikes to burn their feet or plastic ones to melt. These factors eventually provoked a number of stadiums, such as the Kansas City Royals' Kauffman Stadium, to switch from artificial turf back to natural grass.

In 2000, St. Petersburg's Tropicana Field became the first MLB field to use a third-generation artificial surface, FieldTurf. All other remaining artificial turf stadiums were either converted to third-generation surfaces or were replaced entirely by new natural grass stadiums. In a span of 13 years, between 1992 and 2005, the National League went from having half of its teams using artificial turf to all of them playing on natural grass. With the replacement of the Hubert H. Humphrey Metrodome in Minneapolis by Target Field in 2010, only two MLB stadiums used artificial turf from 2010 through 2018: Tropicana Field and Toronto's Rogers Centre. This number grew to three when the Arizona Diamondbacks switched Chase Field to artificial turf for the 2019 season; the stadium had grass from its opening in 1998 until 2018, but the difficulty of maintaining the grass in the stadium, which has a retractable roof and is located in a desert city, was cited as the reason for the switch. In 2020, Miami's Marlins Park also switched to artificial turf for similar reasons, while the Texas Rangers' new Globe Life Field was opened with an artificial surface, as it is also a retractable roof ballpark in a hot weather city; this puts the number of teams using synthetic turf in MLB at five as of 2025. The Rays temporarily moved to the outdoor grass-surfaced George M. Steinbrenner Field in 2025, due to damage suffered to Tropicana Field from Hurricane Milton, leaving four turf stadiums, two in each league. The Rays will return to Tropicana Field for 2026.

=== American football ===
The first professional American football team to play on artificial turf was the Houston Oilers, then part of the American Football League, who moved into the Astrodome in 1968, which had installed AstroTurf two years prior. In 1969, the University of Pennsylvania's Franklin Field in Philadelphia, at the time also home field of the Philadelphia Eagles, switched from grass to AstroTurf, making it the first National Football League stadium to use artificial turf.

In 2002, CenturyLink Field, originally planned to have a natural grass field, was instead surfaced with FieldTurf upon positive reaction from the Seattle Seahawks when they played on the surface at their temporary home of Husky Stadium during the 2000 and 2001 seasons. This would be the first of a leaguewide trend taking place over the next several seasons that would not only result in teams already using artificial surfaces for their fields switching to the new FieldTurf or other similar surfaces but would also see several teams playing on grass adopt a new surface. (The Indianapolis Colts' RCA Dome and the St. Louis Rams' Edward Jones Dome were the last two stadiums in the NFL to replace their first-generation AstroTurf surfaces for next-generation ones after the 2004 season). For example, after a three-year experiment with a natural surface, Giants Stadium went to FieldTurf for 2003, while M&T Bank Stadium added its own artificial surface the same year (it has since been removed and replaced with a natural surface, which the stadium had before installing the turf). Later examples include Paul Brown Stadium, which went from grass to turf in 2004; Gillette Stadium, which made the switch in 2006; and NRG Stadium, which did so in 2015. As of 2021, 14 NFL fields out of 30 are artificial. NFL players overwhelmingly prefer natural grass over synthetic surfaces, according to a league survey conducted in 2010. When asked, "Which surface do you think is more likely to shorten your career?", 90% responded artificial turf. When players were asked "Is the Turf versus Grass debate overblown or a real concern" in an anonymous player survey, 83% believe it is a real concern while 12.3% believe it is overblown.

Following receiver Odell Beckham Jr.'s injury during Super Bowl LVI, other NFL players started calling for turf to be banned since the site of the game, SoFi Stadium, had a turf field and still does, although a grass pitch will be installed for 2026 FIFA World Cup matches at the stadium.

Arena football is played indoors on the older short-pile artificial turf.

=== Canadian football ===
The first professional Canadian football stadium to use artificial turf was Empire Stadium in Vancouver, British Columbia, then home of the Canadian Football League's BC Lions, which installed 3M TartanTurf in 1970. Today, eight of the nine stadiums in the CFL currently use artificial turf, largely because of the harsh weather conditions in the latter-half of the season. The only one that does not is BMO Field in Toronto, which initially had an artificial pitch and has been shared by the CFL's Toronto Argonauts since 2016 (part of the endzones at that stadium are covered with artificial turf). The first stadium to use the next-generation surface was Ottawa's Frank Clair Stadium, which the Ottawa Renegades used when they began play in 2002. The Saskatchewan Roughriders' Taylor Field was the only major professional sports venue in North America to use a second-generation artificial playing surface, Omniturf, which was used from 1988 to 2000, followed by AstroTurf from 2000 to 2007 and FieldTurf from 2007 to its 2016 closure.

=== Cricket ===
Some cricket pitches are made of synthetic grass or of a hybrid of mostly natural and some artificial grass, with these "hybrid pitches" having been implemented across several parts of the United Kingdom and Australia. The first synthetic turf cricket field in the U.S. was opened in Fremont, California in 2016.

=== Field hockey ===
The introduction of synthetic surfaces has significantly changed the sport of field hockey. Since being introduced in the 1970s, competitions in western countries are now mostly played on artificial surfaces. This has increased the speed of the game considerably and changed the shape of hockey sticks to allow for different techniques, such as reverse stick trapping and hitting.

Field hockey artificial turf differs from artificial turf for other sports, in that it does not try to reproduce a grass feel, being made of shorter fibers. This allows the improvement in speed brought by earlier artificial turfs to be retained. This development is problematic for areas which cannot afford to build an extra artificial field for hockey alone. The International Hockey Federation and manufacturers are driving research in order to produce new fields that will be suitable for a variety of sports.

The use of artificial turf in conjunction with changes in the game's rules (e.g., the removal of offside, introduction of rolling substitutes and the self-pass, and to the interpretation of obstruction) have contributed significantly to change the nature of the game, greatly increasing the speed and intensity of play as well as placing far greater demands on the conditioning of the players.

=== Association football ===
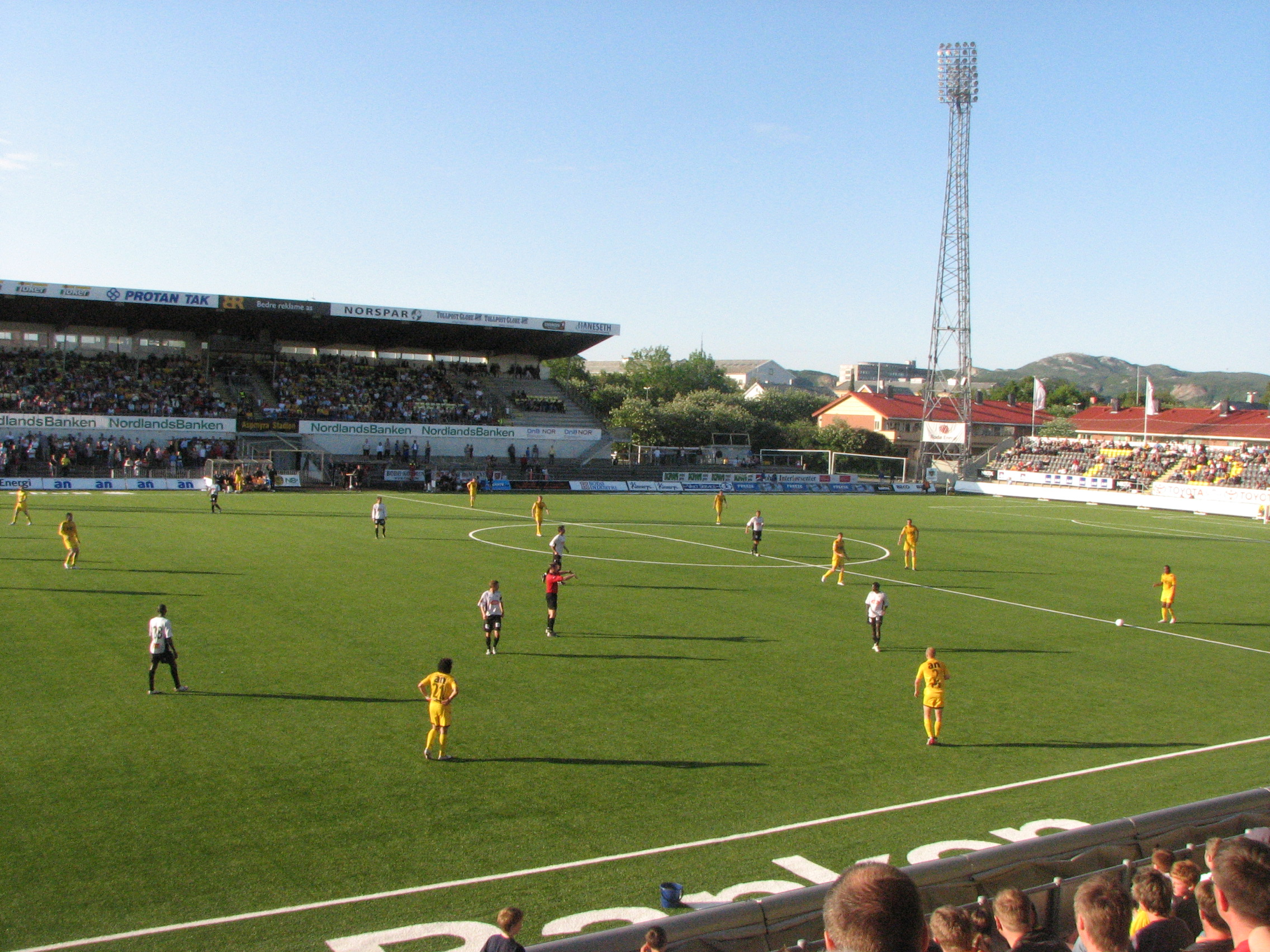
Aspmyra, Norway: home of the football club FK Bodø/Glimt

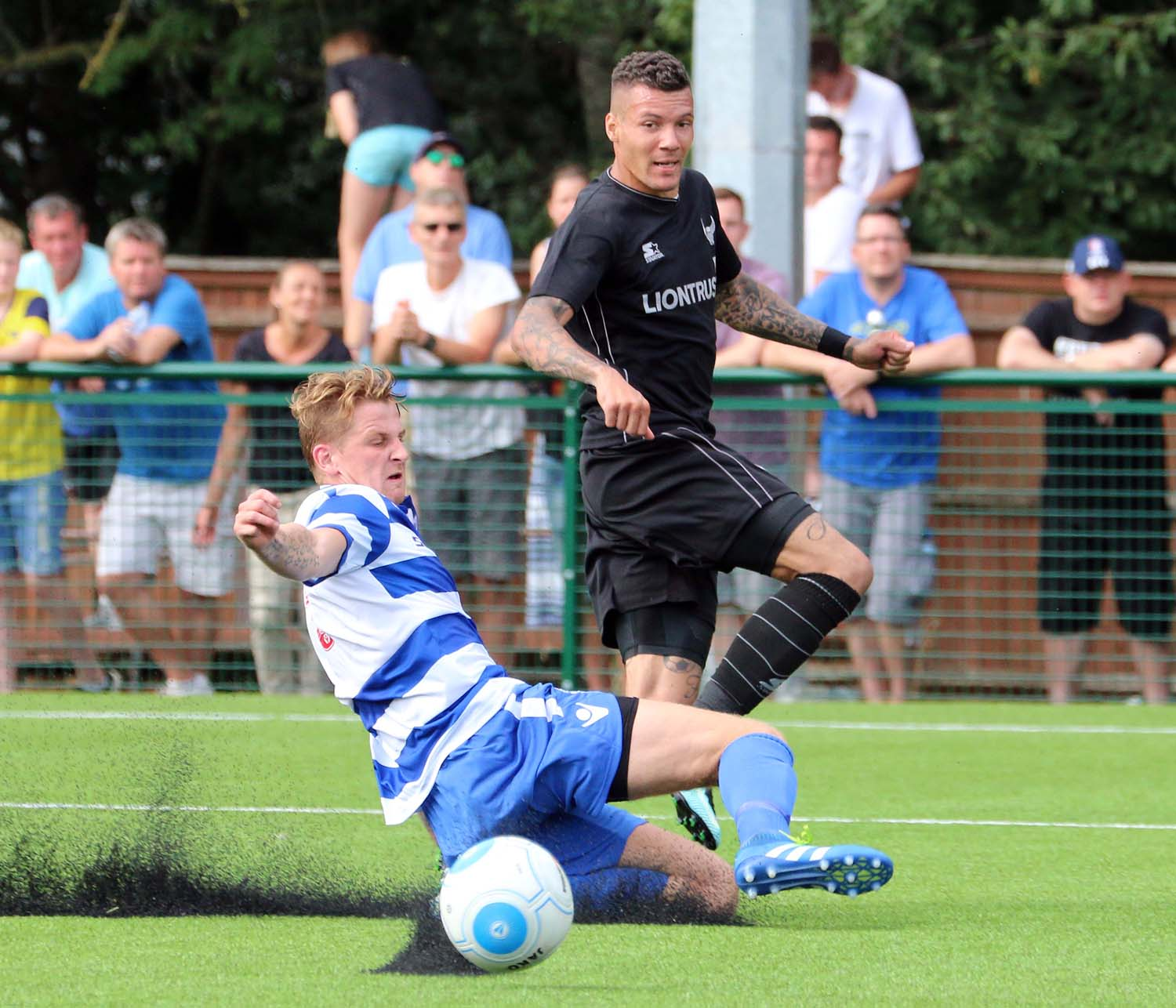
A slide tackle driving up crumbed rubber in the playing surface

The use of artificial turf, and whether they are allowed or not, varies between different tournaments and time periods. Though grass is preferred in general in association football, artificial turf is found in areas where it is seen as impractical to maintain natural grass season-long, with causes including very cold climates (for instance Norway's Eliteserien) or multi-purpose stadiums (Seattle's Lumen Field).

==== Use permitted ====
- UEFA Champions League (2005–)
- UEFA Europa League (2005–)
- UEFA Conference League
- FIFA national team matches (200?–)
- UEFA national team matches (2005–)
- FA Cup
- Swiss Super League
- Allsvenskan
- Danish Superliga
- Eliteserien
- Veikkausliiga
- Meistriliiga
- Cymru Premier
- Campeonato de Portugal
- CONMEBOL tournaments
- Campeonato Brasileiro Série A (2016–)
- Bolivian Primera División
- Major League Soccer

==== Use prohibited ====
- Football League First Division / Premier League (1991–)
- Football League tiers 2-4 (1995–)
- Indian Super League (2015–)
- Primeira Liga and Segunda Liga (2015-)
- Liga 3 (2021-)
- AFC (2025-)
- Eredivisie (2025–)
- Scottish Premiership (2026–)

==== History in England ====
Some association football clubs in Europe installed synthetic surfaces in the 1980s, which were called "plastic pitches" (often derisively) in countries such as England. There, four professional club venues had adopted them; Queens Park Rangers' (QPR) Loftus Road (1981–1988), Luton Town's Kenilworth Road (1985–1991), Oldham Athletic's Boundary Park (1986–1991) and Preston North End's Deepdale (1986–1994). QPR had been the first team to install an artificial pitch at their stadium in 1981, but were the first to remove it when they did so in 1988.

Artificial pitches were banned from top-flight (then First Division) football in 1991, forcing Oldham Athletic to remove their artificial pitch after their promotion to the First Division in 1991, while then top-flight Luton Town also removed their artificial pitch at the same time. The last Football League team to have an artificial pitch in England was Preston North End, who removed their pitch in 1994 after eight years in use. Artificial pitches were banned from the top four divisions from 1995.

Artificial turf gained a bad reputation globally, with fans and especially with players. The first-generation artificial turf surfaces were carpet-like in their look and feel, and thus, a far harder surface than grass and soon became known as an unforgiving playing surface that was prone to cause more injuries, and in particular, more serious joint injuries, than would comparatively be suffered on a grass surface. This turf was also regarded as aesthetically unappealing to many fans.

In 1981, London football club Queens Park Rangers dug up its grass pitch and installed an artificial one. Others followed, and by the mid-1980s there were four artificial surfaces in operation in the English league. They soon became a national joke: the ball pinged round like it was made of rubber, the players kept losing their footing, and anyone who fell over risked carpet burns. Unsurprisingly, fans complained that the football was awful to watch and, one by one, the clubs returned to natural grass.

In November 2011, it was reported that a number of English football clubs were interested in using artificial pitches again on economic grounds. As of January 2020, artificial pitches are not permitted in the Premier League or Football League but are permitted in the National League and lower divisions. Bromley is an example of an English football club who currently uses a third-generation artificial pitch. In 2018, Sutton United were close to achieving promotion to the Football League and the debate in England about artificial pitches resurfaced again. It was reported that, if Sutton won promotion, they would subsequently be demoted two leagues if they refused to replace their pitch with natural grass. After Harrogate Town's promotion to the Football League in 2020, the club was obliged to install a natural grass pitch at Wetherby Road; and after winning promotion in 2021 Sutton was also obliged to tear up their artificial pitch and replace it with grass, at a cost of more than £500,000. Artificial pitches are permitted in all rounds of the FA Cup competition.

==== History elsewhere ====
In the 1990s, many North American soccer clubs also removed their artificial surfaces and re-installed grass, while others moved to new stadiums with state-of-the-art grass surfaces that were designed to withstand cold temperatures where the climate demanded it. The use of artificial turf was later banned by FIFA, UEFA, and many domestic football associations, but FIFA and UEFA allowed it again from the mid-2000's (UEFA from the 2005–06 season onwards), provided that the turfs are FIFA Recommended. UEFA has now been heavily involved in programs to test artificial turf, with tests made in several grounds meeting with FIFA approval. A team of UEFA, FIFA, and German company Polytan conducted tests in the Stadion Salzburg Wals-Siezenheim in Salzburg, Austria which had matches played on it in UEFA Euro 2008. It is the second FIFA 2 Star approved artificial turf in a European domestic top flight, after Dutch club Heracles Almelo received the FIFA certificate in August 2005. The tests were approved.

FIFA originally launched its FIFA Quality Concept in February 2001.

A full international fixture for the 2008 European Championships was played on October 17, 2007, between England and Russia on an artificial surface, which was installed to counteract adverse weather conditions, at the Luzhniki Stadium in Moscow. It was one of the first full international games to be played on such a surface approved by FIFA and UEFA. The latter ordered the 2008 European Champions League final hosted in the same stadium in May 2008 to be played on grass, so a temporary natural grass field was installed just for the final.

In 2007, UEFA stressed that artificial turf should only be considered an option where climatic conditions necessitate. One Desso "hybrid grass" product incorporates both natural grass and artificial elements.

In June 2009, following a match played at Estadio Ricardo Saprissa in Costa Rica, American national team manager Bob Bradley called on FIFA to "have some courage" and ban artificial surfaces.

FIFA designated a star system for artificial turf fields that have undergone a series of tests that examine quality and performance based on a two star system. Recommended one-star fields are mainly intended for recreational use, while Recommended two-star fields that closely follow the standards of professional foodball may be used for FIFA Final Round Competitions as well as for UEFA Europa League and Champions League matches. As of 29 October 2008, there were 104 FIFA Recommended 2-Star installations in the world.

In 2009, FIFA launched the Preferred Producer Initiative to improve the quality of artificial football turf at each stage of the life cycle (manufacturing, installation and maintenance). Currently, there are five manufacturers that were selected by FIFA: Act Global, Limonta, Desso, GreenFields, and Edel Grass. These firms have made quality guarantees directly to FIFA and have agreed to increased research and development.

In 2010, Estadio Omnilife, with an artificial turf, opened in Guadalajara to be the new home of Chivas, one of the most popular teams in Mexico. The owner of Chivas, Jorge Vergara, defended the reasoning behind using artificial turf because the stadium was designed to be "environment friendly and as such, having grass would result [in] using too much water." Some players criticized the field, saying its harder surface caused many injuries. When Johan Cruyff became the adviser of the team, he recommended the switch to natural grass, which the team did in 2012.

The 2015 FIFA Women's World Cup took place entirely on artificial surfaces, as the event was played in Canada, where almost all of the country's stadiums use artificial turf due to climate issues. This plan garnered criticism from players and fans, some believing the artificial surfaces make players more susceptible to injuries. Over fifty of the female athletes protested against the use of artificial turf on the basis of gender discrimination. Australia winger Caitlin Foord said that after playing 90 minutes there was no difference to her post-match recovery – a view shared by the rest of the squad. The squad spent much time preparing on the surface and had no problems with its use in Winnipeg. "We've been training on [artificial] turf pretty much all year so I think we're kind of used to it in that way ... I think grass or turf you can still pull up sore after a game so it's definitely about getting the recovery in and getting it right", Foord said. A lawsuit was filed on October 1, 2014, in an Ontario tribunal court by a group of women's international soccer players against FIFA and the Canadian Soccer Association, and specifically points out that in 1994 FIFA spent $2 million to plant natural grass over artificial turf in New Jersey and Detroit. Various celebrities showed their support for the women soccer players in defense of their lawsuit, including actor Tom Hanks, NBA player Kobe Bryant and U.S. men's soccer team keeper Tim Howard. Even with the possibility of boycotts, FIFA's head of women's competitions, Tatjana Haenni, made it clear that "we play on artificial turf and there's no Plan B."

The first stadium to use artificial turf in Brazil was Atlético Paranaense's Arena da Baixada in 2016. In 2020, the administration of Allianz Parque, home of Sociedade Esportiva Palmeiras, started the implementation of the second artificial pitch in the country.

In 2024, the Eredivisie banned artificial turfs, meaning hybrid grass and natural grass became mandatory, starting from the 2025–26 season.

In UEFA tournaments, teams who are used to playing on artificial turf are seen as having a large home advantage against teams who don't, as was the case for Bodø/Glimt's semi-final campaign in the 2024–25 UEFA Europa League.

=== Rugby union ===
Rugby union also uses artificial surfaces at a professional level. Infill fields are used by English Premiership Rugby teams Gloucester, Newcastle Falcons, Saracens F.C. and the now defunct Worcester Warriors, as well as United Rugby Championship teams Cardiff, Edinburgh and Glasgow Warriors. Some fields, including Twickenham Stadium, have incorporated a hybrid field, with grass and synthetic fibers used on the surface. This allows for the field to be much more hard wearing, making it less susceptible to weather conditions and frequent use.

=== Tennis ===
Carpet has been used as a surface for indoor tennis courts for decades, though the first carpets used were more similar to home carpets than a synthetic grass. After the introduction of AstroTurf, it came to be used for tennis courts, both indoor and outdoor, though only a small minority of courts use the surface. Both infill and non-infill versions are used, and are typically considered medium-fast to fast surfaces under the International Tennis Federation's classification scheme. A distinct form found in tennis is an "artificial clay" surface, which seeks to simulate a clay court by using a very short pile carpet with an infill of the same loose aggregate used for clay courts that rises above the carpet fibers.

Tennis courts such as Wimbledon are considering using an artificial hybrid grass to replace their natural lawn courts. Such systems incorporate synthetic fibers into natural grass to create a more durable surface on which to play. Such hybrid surfaces are currently used for some association football stadiums, including Wembley Stadium.

=== Golf ===
Synthetic turf can also be used in the golf industry, such as on driving ranges, putting greens and even in some circumstances tee boxes. For low budget courses, particularly those catering to casual golfers, synthetic putting greens offer the advantage of being a relatively cheap alternative to installing and maintaining grass greens, but are much more similar to real grass in appearance and feel compared to sand greens which are the traditional alternative surface. Because of the vast areas of golf courses and the damage from clubs during shots, it is not feasible to surface fairways with artificial turf.

=== Pesäpallo ===
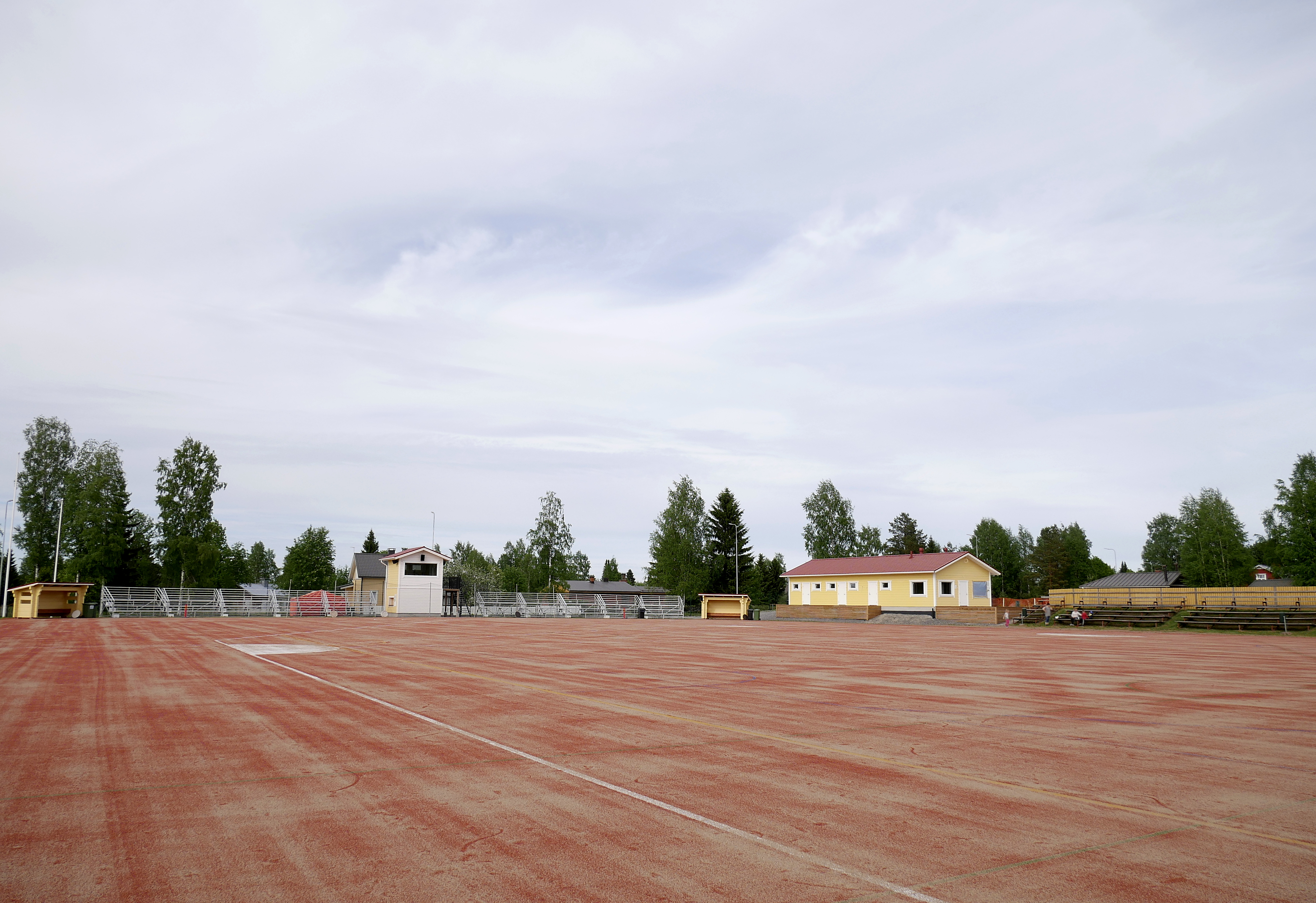
The surface on Veikkolan pesäpallostadion in Lappajärvi.

Though all pesäpallo teams in the higher leagues (including Superpesis) play on clay courts, several teams' stadiums use carpet-type artificial grass below the clay.

=== Motor racing ===
Artificial grass is used to line the perimeter of some sections of some motor circuits, and offers less grip than some other surfaces. It can pose an obstacle to drivers if it gets caught on their car.

== Other applications ==
=== Landscaping ===
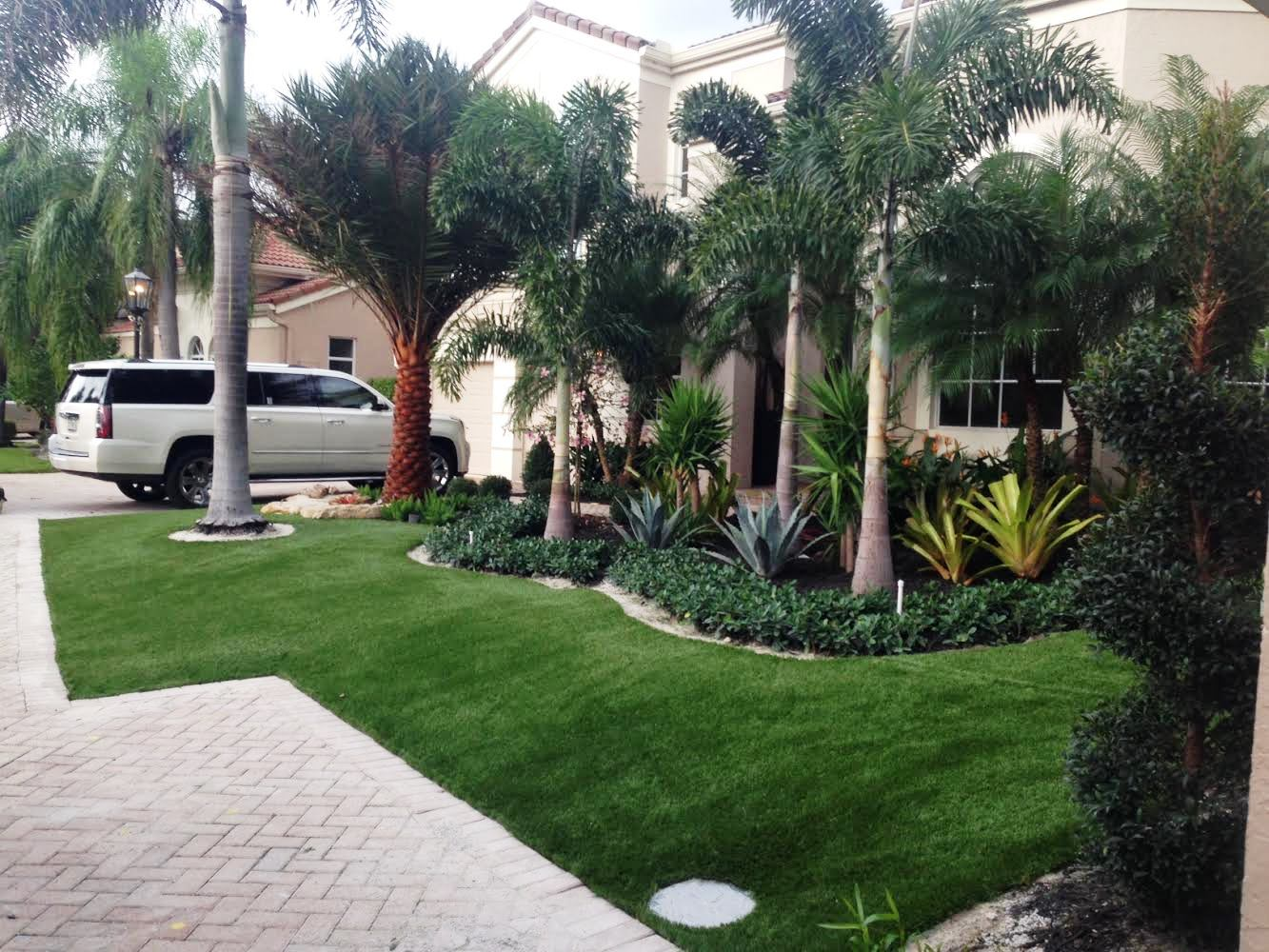
A home's yard with artificial grass.

Since the early 1990s, the use of synthetic grass in the more arid western states of the United States has moved beyond athletic fields to residential and commercial landscaping. New water saving programs, as of 2019, which grant rebates for turf removal, do not accept artificial turf as replacement and require a minimum of plants.

The use of artificial grass for convenience sometimes faces opposition: Legislation frequently seeks to preserve natural gardens and fully water permeable surfaces, therefore restricting the use of hardscape and plantless areas, including artificial turf. In several locations in different countries, homeowners have been fined, ordered to remove artificial turf or had to defend themselves in courts. Many of these restrictions can be found in local bylaws and ordinances. These are not always applied in a consistent manner, especially in municipalities that utilize a complaint-based model for enforcing local laws.

=== Airports ===
Artificial turf has been used at airports. Here it provides several advantages over natural turf – it does not support wildlife, it has high visual contrast with runways in all seasons, it reduces foreign object damage (FOD) since the surface has no rocks or clumps, and it drains well.

Some artificial turf systems allow for the integration of fiber-optic fibers into the turf. This would allow for runway lighting to be embedded in artificial landing surfaces for aircraft (or lighting or advertisements to be directly embedded in a playing surface).

=== Tanks for octopuses ===
Artificial turf is commonly used for tanks containing octopuses, in particular the Giant Pacific octopus since it is a reliable way to prevent the octopuses from escaping their tank, as they prevent the suction cups on the tentacles from getting a tight seal.

== Environmental and safety concerns ==
=== Environmental footprint ===
The first major academic review of the environmental and health risks and benefits of artificial turf was published in 2014; it was followed by extensive research on possible risks to human health, but holistic analyses of the environmental footprint of artificial turf compared with natural turf only began to emerge in the 2020s, and frameworks to support informed policymaking were still lacking. Evaluating the relative environmental footprints of natural and artificial turf is complex, with outcomes depending on a wide range of factors, including (to give the example of a sports field):

- what ecosystem services are lost by converting a site to a sports pitch
- how resource-intensive is the landscaping work and transport of materials to create a pitch
- whether input materials are recycled and whether these are recycled again at the end of the pitch's life
- how resource-intensive and damaging maintenance is (whether through water, fertiliser, weed-killer, reapplication of rubber crumb, snow-clearing, etc.)
- how intensively the facility is used, for how long, and whether surface type can reduce the overall number of pitches required

Artificial turf has been shown to contribute to global warming by absorbing significantly more radiation than living turf and, to a lesser extent, by displacing living plants that could sequester carbon dioxide through photosynthesis; a study at New Mexico State University found that in that environment, water-cooling of artificial turf can demand as much water as natural turf. However, a 2022 study that used real-world data to model a ten-year-life-cycle environmental footprint for a new natural-turf soccer field compared with an artificial-turf field found that the natural-turf field contributed twice as much to global warming as the artificial one (largely due to a more resource-intensive construction phase), while finding that the artificial turf would likely cause more pollution of other kinds. The study promoted improvements to usual practice such as the substitution of cork for rubber in artificial pitches and more drought-resistant grasses and electric mowing in natural ones. In 2021, a Zurich University of Applied Sciences study for the city of Zurich, using local data on extant pitches, found that, per hour of use, natural turf had the lowest environmental footprint, followed by artificial turf with no infill, and then artificial turf using an infill (e.g. granulated rubber). However, because it could tolerate more hours of use, unfilled artificial turf often had the lowest environmental footprint in practice, by reducing the total number of pitches required. The study recommended optimising the use of existing pitches before building new ones, and choosing the best surface for the likely intensity of use. Another suggestion is the introduction of green roofs to offset the conversion of grassland to artificial turf.

=== Maintenance ===
Contrary to popular belief, artificial turf is not maintenance free. It requires regular maintenance, such as raking and patching, to keep it functional and safe.

=== Pollution and associated health risks ===
Some artificial turf uses infill, such as silica sand, but most use granulated rubber, referred to as "crumb rubber". Granulated rubber can be made from recycled car tires and may carry heavy metals, PFAS chemicals, and other chemicals of environmental concern. The synthetic fibers of artificial turf are also subject to degradation. Thus chemicals from artificial turfs leach into the environment, and artificial turf is a source of microplastics pollution and rubber pollution in air, fresh-water, sea and soil environments. In Norway, Sweden, and at least some other places, the rubber granulate from artificial turf infill constitutes the second largest source of microplastics in the environment after the tire and road wear particles that make up a large portion of the fine road debris. In samples of Mediterranean seawater, fibres from artificial turf made up more than 15% of the larger plastic particles. As early as 2007, Environment and Human Health, Inc., a lobby-group, proposed a moratorium on the use of ground-up rubber tires in fields and playgrounds based on health concerns; in September 2022, the European Commission made a draft proposal to restrict the use of microplastic granules as infill in sports fields.

What is less clear is how likely this pollution is in practice to harm humans or other organisms and whether these environmental costs outweigh the benefits of artificial turf, with many scientific papers and government agencies (such as the United States Environmental Protection Agency) calling for more research. A 2018 study published in Water, Air, & Soil Pollution analyzed the chemicals found in samples of tire crumbs, some used to install school athletic fields, and identified 92 chemicals, only about half of which had ever been studied for their health effects and some of which are known to be carcinogenic or irritants. It stated "caution would argue against use of these materials where human exposure is likely, and this is especially true for playgrounds and athletic playing fields where young people may be affected". Conversely, a 2017 study in Sports Medicine argued that "regular physical activity during adolescence and early adulthood helps prevent cancer later in life. Restricting the use or availability of all-weather year-round synthetic fields and thereby potentially reducing exercise could, in the long run, actually increase cancer incidence, as well as cardiovascular disease and other chronic illnesses."

The possibility that carcinogenic substances in artificial turf could increase risks of human cancer (the artificial turf–cancer hypothesis) gained a particularly high profile in the first decades of the twenty-first century and attracted extensive study, with scientific reports around 2020 finding cancer-risks in modern artificial turf negligible. But concerns have extended to other human-health risks, such as endocrine disruption that might affect early puberty, obesity, and children's attention spans. Potential harm to fish populations has also been shown.

A study for the New Jersey Department of Environmental Protection analyzed lead and other metals in dust kicked into the air by physical activity on five artificial turf fields. The results suggest that even low levels of activity on the field can cause particulate matter containing these chemicals to get into the air where it can be inhaled and be harmful. The authors state that since no level of lead exposure is considered safe for children, "only a comprehensive mandated testing of fields can provide assurance that no health hazard on these fields exists from lead or other metals used in their construction and maintenance."

=== Kinesiological health risks ===
A number of health and safety concerns have been raised about artificial turf. Friction between skin and older generations of artificial turf can cause abrasions or burns to a much greater extent than natural grass. Artificial turf tends to retain heat from the sun and can be much hotter than natural grass with prolonged exposure to the sun.

There is some evidence that periodic disinfection of artificial turf is required as pathogens are not broken down by natural processes in the same manner as natural grass. Despite this, a 2006 study suggests certain microbial life is less active in artificial turf.

There is evidence showing higher rates of player injury on artificial turf. By November 1971, the injury toll on first-generation artificial turf had reached a threshold that resulted in congressional hearings by the House subcommittee on commerce and finance. In a study performed by the National Football League (NFL) Injury and Safety Panel, published in the October 2012 issue of the American Journal of Sports Medicine, Elliott B. Hershman et al. reviewed injury data from NFL games played between 2000 and 2009, finding that "the injury rate of knee sprains as a whole was 22% higher on FieldTurf than on natural grass. While MCL sprains did not occur at a rate significantly higher than on grass, rates of ACL sprains were 67% higher on FieldTurf." Metatarsophalangeal joint sprain, known as "turf toe" when the big toe is involved, is named from the injury being associated with playing sports on rigid surfaces such as artificial turf and is a fairly common injury among professional American football players. Artificial turf is a harder surface than grass and does not have much "give" when forces are placed on it.

== See also ==
- International Association for Sports Surface Sciences
- List of college football stadiums with non-traditional field colors
- Poly-Turf
- The Flying Grass Carpet
