= IS-3 (disambiguation) =

IS-3 may refer to:

- IS-3 ABC, a single-seat training glider designed and built in Poland
- IS-3 (tank), a 1945 Soviet heavy tank
- IS-3 standard, a standard for the Advanced Mobile Phone System

== See also ==
- ISSS (disambiguation)
- IS (disambiguation)
