= Artificial turf–cancer hypothesis =

Overview of the theory that artificial turf causes illness

Artificial turf is a collection of synthetic fibers that is designed and manufactured with the intention of resembling the appearance and function of naturally growing grass. Due to its low maintenance, convenience, and being more hard-wearing and resistant than natural surfaces, it is popularly utilized in sports fields. Most artificial turf fields contain massive amounts of crumb rubber infill, a material that is usually sourced from recycled tires; this use is highly controversial due to concerns of tires containing and expelling carcinogens, with more detailed research currently ongoing. Modern controversy and debate center around harmful byproducts, such as microplastics, and the hundreds of emerging and growing chemicals that result from the chemical process of the breakdown of artificial turf over time. There are also numerous threats to environmental health and the overall sustainability of our ecosystems and planet. With consequences ranging from increased heating and radiation effects to proven effects on aquatic and land ecosystems and organisms, turf use has gained traction within the conversation of sustainability. While biological effects have been observed and studied within animal and laboratory studies, the effects within humans specifically are under-researched and limited as of right now.

== Studies ==
An unpublished study by Rutgers University examined crumb rubber from synthetic fields in New York City. It found six potentially carcinogenic polycyclic aromatic hydrocarbons (PAHs) at levels excessive to state regulations. The researchers warned that the findings could have been affected by solvent extraction used to release the chemicals from the rubber.

In a statistical study of the list of soccer players with cancer provided by UW coach Amy Griffin, public health researchers for the State of Washington found that the rates of cancer were lower than was estimated for the general population. They recommend that players not restrict their play due to the presumed health benefits of being active.

In 2007, the California Office of Environmental Health Assessment (OEHHA) simulated interactions children could possibly have if they came in direct contact with artificial turf. Results showed that five chemicals, including four polycyclic aromatic hydrocarbons, were found in samples. One of these compounds, chrysene, was present at levels higher than the standard established by OEHHA. Chrysene is a known carcinogen, meaning it can increase the risk of a child developing cancer.

In late 2015, the United States Congress' House Energy and Commerce Committee ordered for the Environmental Protection Agency (EPA) to investigate a link. As of 2016, the EPA, the Consumer Product Safety Commission and the Centers for Disease Control and Prevention are investigating.

In 2018, a study commissioned by the Dutch minister of Health, Welfare and Sport from the Dutch National Institute for Public Health and the Environment stated that "our findings for a representative number of Dutch pitches are consistent with those of prior and contemporary studies observing no elevated health risk from playing sports on synthetic turf pitches with recycled rubber granulate".

A 2019 Yale study concluded that there were 306 chemicals in crumb rubber and that 52 of these chemicals were classified as carcinogens by the Environmental Protection Agency (EPA). They stated that there is "a vacuum in our knowledge about the carcinogenic properties of many crumb rubber infill." They concluded that "The crumb rubber infill of artificial turf fields contains or emits chemicals that can affect human physiology."

In 2020, the European Risk Assessment Study on Synthetic Turf Rubber Infill was completed; published in Science of the Total Environment, this was a scientific study funded by companies and industry associations from the tyre granulate supply chain, drawing on data from diverse parts of Europe. The researchers concluded that "there are no relevant health risks associated with the use of synthetic turfs with ELT-derived infill material".

A 2022 study published in the same journal analyzed the composition of synthetic turf football pitches from 17 countries. It confirmed the presence of "hazardous substances in the recycled crumb rubber samples collected all around the world" including PAHs of high and very high concern. The study concluded that different stakeholders "must work on a consensus to protect not only human health but also the environment, since there is evidence that crumb rubber hazardous chemicals can reach the environment and affect wildlife." The paper did not, however, discuss cancer risk in any detail.

In March 2023, investigative reporters from the Philadelphia Inquirer bought souvenir samples of the old Veterans Stadium AstroTurf used from 1977–81 and commissioned diagnostics through the Eurofins Environmental Testing laboratory. The resulting lab report linked per- and polyfluoroalkyl substances (PFAS) to the turf. Six former Philadelphia Phillies who played at Veterans Stadium, home to the team from 1971 to 2003, died from glioblastoma, an aggressive brain cancer: Tug McGraw, Darren Daulton, John Vukovich, Johnny Oates, Ken Brett, and David West.

In 2025, Northeastern University conducted a study examining the chemical transformations that occur as artificial turf degrades and breaks down over time. The researchers simulated natural and environmental processes, such as increased heat and sunlight exposure. They were able to replicate many of these environmental processes through a photoreactor to help accelerate the deterioration within the turf and crumb rubber that we would usually see naturally over time. Researchers found that the chemicals grew and multiplied into over 572 different chemical compounds. The study builds on the foundations of tire-centric research, most notably, they researched heavily on 6PPD, a compound that is found and used in the manufacturing of rubber tires that prevents cracking. When 6PPD reacts with our atmosphere, it mutates into 6PPD-quinone, a compound that is known to be extremely toxic and harmful to coho salmon. The runoff and presence of 6PPD-quinone within aquatic environments are highly correlated with rising mortality rates within fish species such as coho salmon. The study also discovered other harmful compounds that mutated from the degradation of crumb rubber, including 4-HDPA, which has been linked as a potential endocrine disruptor. Researchers noted that many of the mutations and emerging chemical compounds have not been tested for impact on human health. Researchers are working towards discovering causal chains between artificial turf and long-term health impacts.

== Testimonies ==
Nigel Maguire, formerly a chief executive for the National Health Service in Cumbria, claims that his son, a goalkeeper, could have developed Hodgkin's lymphoma by playing on an artificial surface. He has called for a ban on the surfaces, saying "It is obscene so little research has been done."

In 2014, Amy Griffin, soccer coach at the University of Washington, surveyed American players of the sport who had developed cancer. Of 38 players, 34 were goalkeepers, a position in which diving to the surface makes accidental ingestion or blood contact with crumb rubber more likely, Griffin has asserted. Lymphoma and leukemia, cancers of the blood, predominated.

== Sports organizations ==
FIFA, the world governing body of association football (soccer), has stated that the evidence weighs in favour of artificial pitches being safe. The Football Association of England stated in February 2016 that they were observing reports and conducting their own research on the issue.

== Environmental impact and sustainability ==
Research and modern testing have revealed the underlying truths that artificial turf poses to our environment and planet. Not only does it pose potential human health concerns, but it also poses concerns to our own planet's sustainability and longevity. A 2025 Sustainability Scholars report that was prepared for the City of Vancouver has helped bring awareness of this modern-day problem. Studies have suggested that the implementation of artificial turf kills not only the grass that it is replacing but also the organisms that live within the soil. These organisms, such as worms, bacteria, insects, and nutrients, contribute heavily to soil health and sustainability. On a mechanical level, it disrupts the ecosystems within the soil that are vital to Earth.

Artificial turf has also been linked to decreases in biodiversity within the environments they are being installed. Physically replacing natural grass with artificial turf contributes to habitat fragmentation and reduced ecological connectivity. Artificial turf also releases microplastics and tire-derived particles to waterways and sources of irrigation. These harmful contaminants can enter the surrounding soils and waterways, raising concerns about water quality for both animals and humans.

Studies have shown that artificial turf amplifies the "heat island" effect that is already present due to other problems within the modern topic of sustainability. Research has shown that artificial turf can reach significantly higher temperatures in comparison to natural grass. Artificial turf can also retain heat, which is known as the "heat island" effect. Since turf has no natural processes to stop this modern problem, it continues to contribute to the rising temperatures and climate change we are currently witnessing.

== Current and ongoing policies and regulations ==
Policies and regulations revolving around the topic of artificial turf vary significantly across countries and governing bodies. The governing body that has taken the largest stance is the European Union, as it implemented several regulations that directly take action towards turf use. The European Chemicals Agency (ECHA) has placed limits on the levels at which polycyclic aromatic hydrocarbons (PAHs) can be found within turf and crumb rubber infill. The EU was able to limit manufacturers to a combined concentration of eight prominent PAHs to 20 mg/kg. This policy primarily targets new turf that is being manufactured for public consumption and use.

The EU has been known to take real action towards policies and regulations on artificial turf use. They have enacted chemical restrictions and limits on manufacturers. They are currently taking a clear stance on the presence and pollution of microplastics that are being expelled from the use of turf. As of 2025, the EU has proposed restrictions and the potential expulsion of microplastics within our environment due to their clear correlation with environmental contamination and threat to several ecological concerns. The EU has also proposed, in 2025, additional regulatory efforts concerning many harmful and carcinogenic chemicals, including PFAS. They have proposed restrictions on these chemicals as they have strong correlative human health concerns and consequences.

Within the United States, there are currently no official rulings and regulations that have been enacted on the federal level. Many local and state governments have taken action and have addressed the growing concerns and debate around artificial turf use. Several state governments, such as Washington DC, Hartford, Connecticut, Montgomery County, Maryland, and New York City, have enacted their own legislation. These states have all trended towards enacting moratoriums on the installation and implementation of artificial turf fields. These policies have generally focused on newly installed fields in the hopes of encouraging more sustainable alternatives and methods to be incorporated and utilized. United States federal agencies such as the EPA and CDC have contributed to and funded studies on the risks and consequences of turf use; there are still no federal regulations as of yet. The initiative and funding from the federal level do signify a national growing initiative towards a negative stance on turf use.

China has taken a stance towards turf use through strict regulations on the presence of harmful chemicals and substances found within artificial turf. China has specifically restricted heavy metals, volatile organic compounds, and PAHs in turf use and manufacturing.

International organizations and governments have taken notice and started to speak out and address the consequences of turf use, focusing primarily on the chemical risks and findings that have emerged. These bodies have established broader agreements and standards rather than specifically targeting turf use and manufacturing itself. The Stockholm Convention, a United Nations treaty, focused on the harmful chemicals and compounds that are associated with and found within crumb rubber and turf use. The UN specifically focused on restricting PFAS and PFOA.
