= Running track =

Artificial running surface

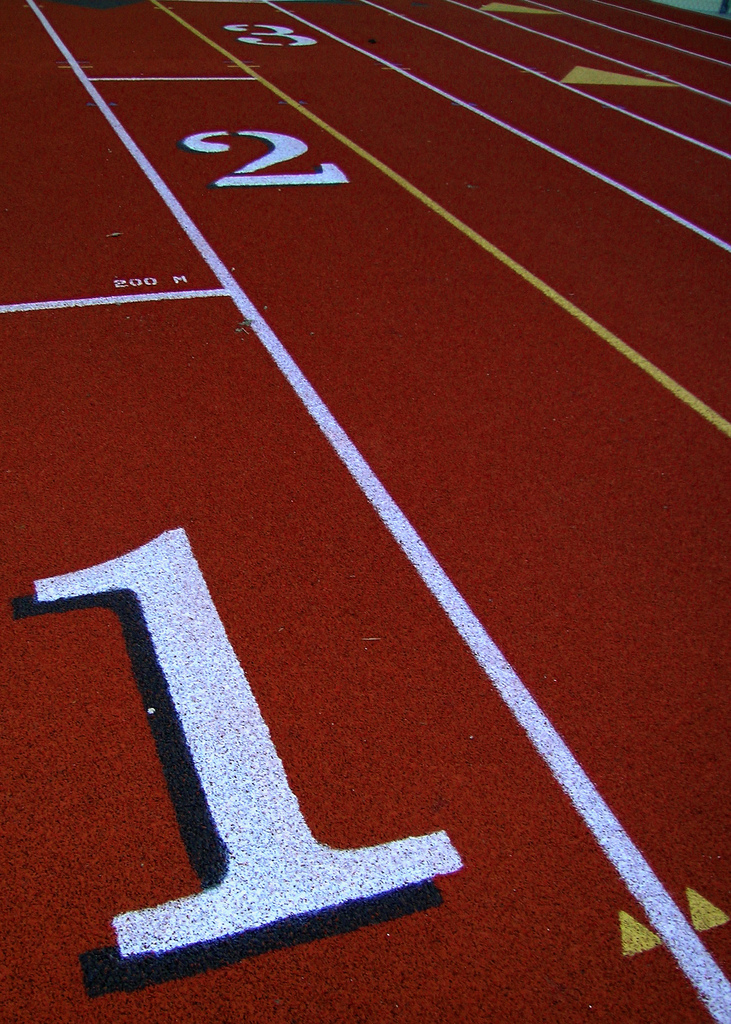
Starting lines on an all-weather track

An all-weather running track is a rubberized, artificial running surface for track and field athletics. It provides a consistent surface for competitors to test their athletic ability unencumbered by adverse weather conditions. Historically, various forms of dirt, rocks, sand, and crushed cinders were used. Many examples of these varieties of track still exist worldwide.

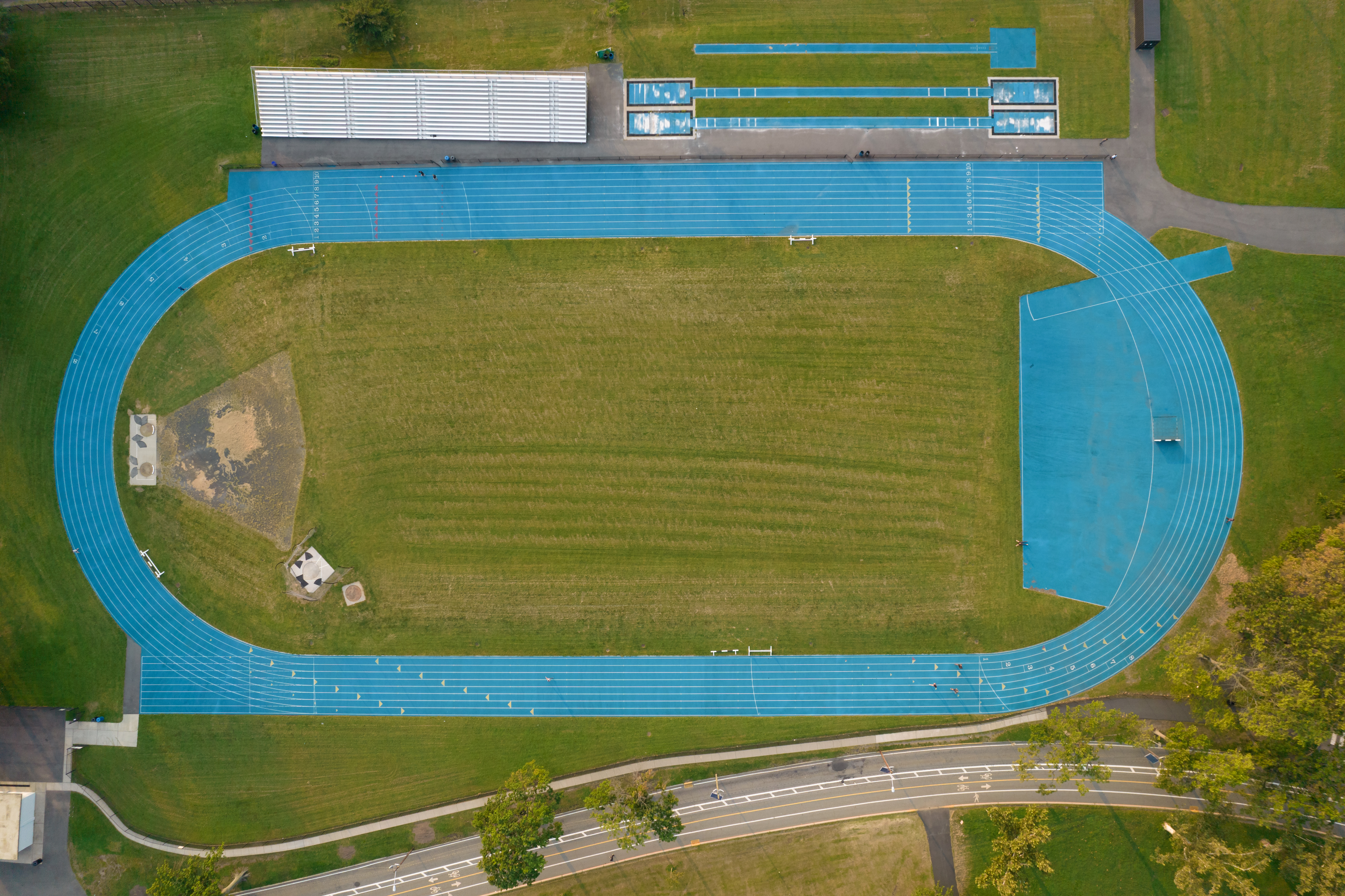
Aerial view of a standard 400-metre running track.

== Surfaces ==
Starting in 1954, artificial surfaces using a combination of rubber and asphalt began to appear. An artificial warm-up track was constructed for the 1956 Summer Olympics in Melbourne, Australia. During the 1960s many of these tracks were constructed; examples still exist today.

In the mid-1960s Tartan tracks were developed, surfaced with a product by 3M. The name Tartan is a trademark, but it is sometimes used as a genericized trademark. This process was the first to commercialize a polyurethane surface for running tracks, though it was originally conceived for horse racing. Many Tartan tracks were installed worldwide, including at many of the top universities in the United States. Among that list was a Tartan track installed in the Estadio Olímpico Universitario, home of the 1968 Summer Olympics at Mexico City, which were the first global championships to use such a track. Olympic shot put champion Bill Nieder was instrumental in developing the product and selling it for this first use in the Olympics. An all-weather surface has become standard ever since.

Another Tartan track was installed on a temporary basis for the 1968 United States Olympic Trials held at altitude at Echo Summit, California, before being moved to South Tahoe Middle School, where it survived for almost 40 years.

There are other techniques that distribute small chunks of rubber then adhere them in place with various polyurethane or latex substances.

World Athletics, the governing body for international track and field competitions, publishes very specific regulations for the conduct of Global Championship or International level track meets under their jurisdiction.

Since the early 1980s, the manufacturer of the surfaces selected for most championship meets has been the Italian company, Mondo, again the trademarked brand name becoming used as a genericized trademark. Mondo's track surface is called Mondotrack. The surface differs from the particles stuck in adhesion techniques, in that they are more of a rubber carpet, cut to size then tightly seamed together (in the linear direction along the lane lines). This form of construction gives a more consistent bounce (or energy return) and traction. Because of the tight fit specifications required for manufacture, construction surrounding these sites also has to be of a higher standard, making a Mondotrack one of the most expensive systems to use. Examples of Mondotracks were used for the 1996 Summer Olympics (since removed from the Centennial Olympic Stadium) in Atlanta, Georgia, United States; 2004 Summer Olympics in Athens, Greece; 2008 Summer Olympics in Beijing, China; 2012 Summer Olympics in London, United Kingdom and the 2016 Summer Olympics in Rio de Janeiro, Brazil.

Another player in the marketplace is the formerly BASF-owned company Conica, based in Switzerland, now part of the Serafin Group (Munich, Germany), which can boast the 2009 World Championships in Athletics in Berlin, Germany (where Usain Bolt improved his 100 metres and 200 metres world records), along with other record hosting venues like Stadio Olimpico in Rome, Italy.

== Measurement of a track ==
The proper length of the first lane of a competitive running track is 400 m (1,312.3 ft).

Some tracks are not built to this specification, instead being a legacy to imperial distances such as 440 yd (402.336 m), equivalent to a quarter of a mile.

Prior to rule changes in 1979, distances in Imperial units were still used in the United States. Some facilities build tracks to fit the available space, with one of the most notable examples of this being Franklin Field, where the 400 metre distance is achieved in lane 4.

Olympic tracks in the early 20th century were of other lengths: each lane of the track could (by IAAF rules should) be as wide as 122 cm (4.00 ft), though the majority of American tracks are built to NFHS high school specifications that allow smaller lanes. The IAAF also specifies a preferred radius for the turns at 37 metres, but also allows a range. Major international level meets are conducted and world records can be set on tracks that are not exactly 37 meters, provided they fall within the legal range.

=== Lane measurement ===
Track and field stadium layout

Lane	Total length	Radius	Semi-circle length	Delta (200m)	Delta (400m)	Delta (800m)
1	400.000 m	36.80 m	115.611 m	0.000 m	0.000 m	0.000 m
2	407.037 m	37.92 m	119.129 m	3.519 m	7.037 m	3.526 m
3	414.703 m	39.14 m	122.962 m	7.351 m	14.703 m	7.384 m
4	422.368 m	40.36 m	126.795 m	11.184 m	22.368 m	11.259 m
5	430.034 m	41.58 m	130.627 m	15.017 m	30.034 m	15.151 m
6	437.699 m	42.80 m	134.460 m	18.850 m	37.699 m	19.060 m
7	445.365 m	44.02 m	138.293 m	22.682 m	45.365 m	22.987 m
8	453.030 m	45.24 m	142.126 m	26.515 m	53.030 m	26.930 m

- Lane – The ordinal number of the lane with the first lane being on the inside
- Total length – The total length of the lane
- Radius – The radius of the curve 0.30m (for lane 1) and 0.20m (for lane 2 to lane 8) from the inner side into that lane
- Semi-circle length – The length of the half circle of track at that radius
- Delta (200m) – The length a track of this radius is longer than the inside track for a 200m race (and thus how much lead-in is needed to make it a fair race)
- Delta (400m) – The length a track of this radius is longer than the inside track for a 400m race (and thus how much lead-in is needed to make it a fair race)
- Delta (800m) – The length a track of this radius is longer than the inside track for a 800m race (and thus how much lead-in is needed to make it a fair race)

== See also ==
- International Association for Sports Surface Sciences
- Track and field § Stadiums
