= The Flying Grass Carpet =

Artificial grass rug

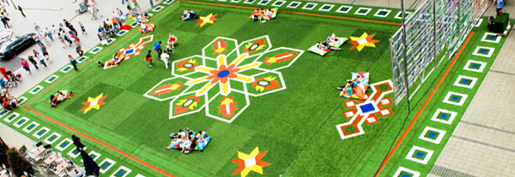
The Flying Grass Carpet

The Flying Grass Carpet is a huge rug entirely made of artificial grass. It travels around the world, as a temporary landscape. It's intended as space to play on and enjoy, but can also be used for picnics, open-air festivals and sports .

The Flying Grass Carpet has been to the following cities:

- 2008: Amsterdam - Aachen - Rotterdam;
- 2009: Budapest - Berlin - Eindhoven - Madrid - Santa Cruz de Tenerife ;
- 2010: Pécs - Essen - Utrecht - Shanghai - Istanbul.

== Concept ==
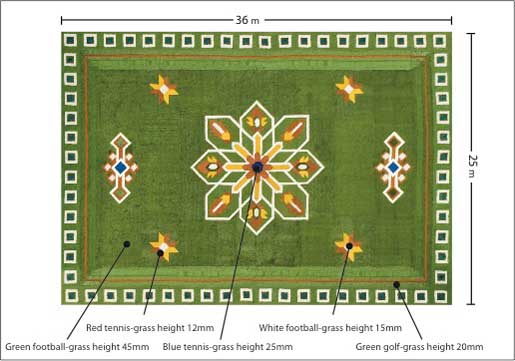

The designers of The Flying Grass Carpet live in Rotterdam, a city known for its designers and architects. The designers of the Flying Grass Carpet are fond of cities and city-life but are concerned about the loss of quality of the public space in a lot of cities. To make a positive gesture they created The Flying Grass Carpet.

The Flying Grass Carpet travels to different places around the world, and stays in the different locations for a short period of time. It's intended to function as an actual park, allowing people to enjoy all the activities they can normally only enjoy in the park, in the middle of the city. The Flying Grass Carpet is also intended to connect different cities and their citizens with each other, and create what its designers call a "worldwide shared public domain".

== Gallery ==
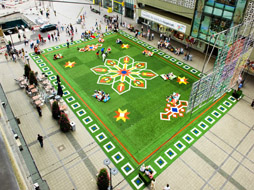
The Flying Grass Carpet

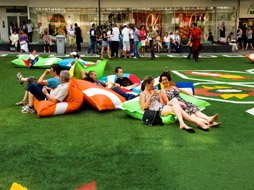

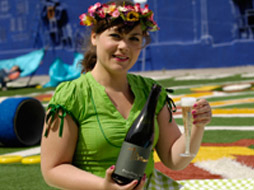

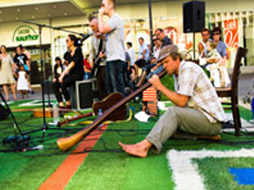

== Technical details ==
The carpet contains several types and colors of grass. It weighs 6375 kilograms (6.5 kg per square meter). The size of the carpet is adjustable, and can be up to 25 by 36 meters.

== Award ==
The Flying Grass Carpet won a 'Dutch Design Award' in 2009
