= International Association for Sports Surface Sciences =

The International Association for Sports Surface Sciences (ISSS) is the union of labs and experts in the field of sports surfaces. It was founded in 1985 in Switzerland. Its aims are the exchange of information and ideas regarding testing sports surfaces such as sports hall floors, synthetic surfaces of athletic tracks and artificial turf surfaces. Members are located all over the world.

The ISSS is officially related to the IAAF. The ISSS has a board of directors consisting of Hans J. Kolitzus (CH/D), Vic Watson (GB), Ties Joosten (NL) and Alastair Cox (GB)). The head office is located in Switzerland. The ISSS organizes regular Technical Meetings with experts from the industry to discuss issues of common interest.
