= Water, Air, & Soil Pollution =

Peer-reviewed environmental science journal

- Discipline: Environmental science
- Language: English
- Edited by: Jack T. Trevors

Publication details
- History: 1971-present
- Publisher: Springer Science+Business Media
- Frequency: Monthly
- Impact factor: 1.900 (2019)

Standard abbreviations
- ISO 4: Water Air Soil Pollut.

Indexing
- CODEN: WAPLAC
- ISSN: 0049-6979 (print); 1573-2932 (web)
- LCCN: 2004233291
- OCLC no.: 866089487

Links
- Journal homepage; Online archive

Water, Air, & Soil Pollution is a monthly peer-reviewed scientific journal covering the study of environmental pollution. It was established in 1971 and is published by Springer Science+Business Media. The editor-in-chief is Jack T. Trevors. According to the Journal Citation Reports, the journal has a 2017 impact factor of 1.769.
